= Second Müller senate =

State government of Berlin

Second Senate of Michael Müller Senate Müller II
- 27th Senate of Berlin
- 2016–2021
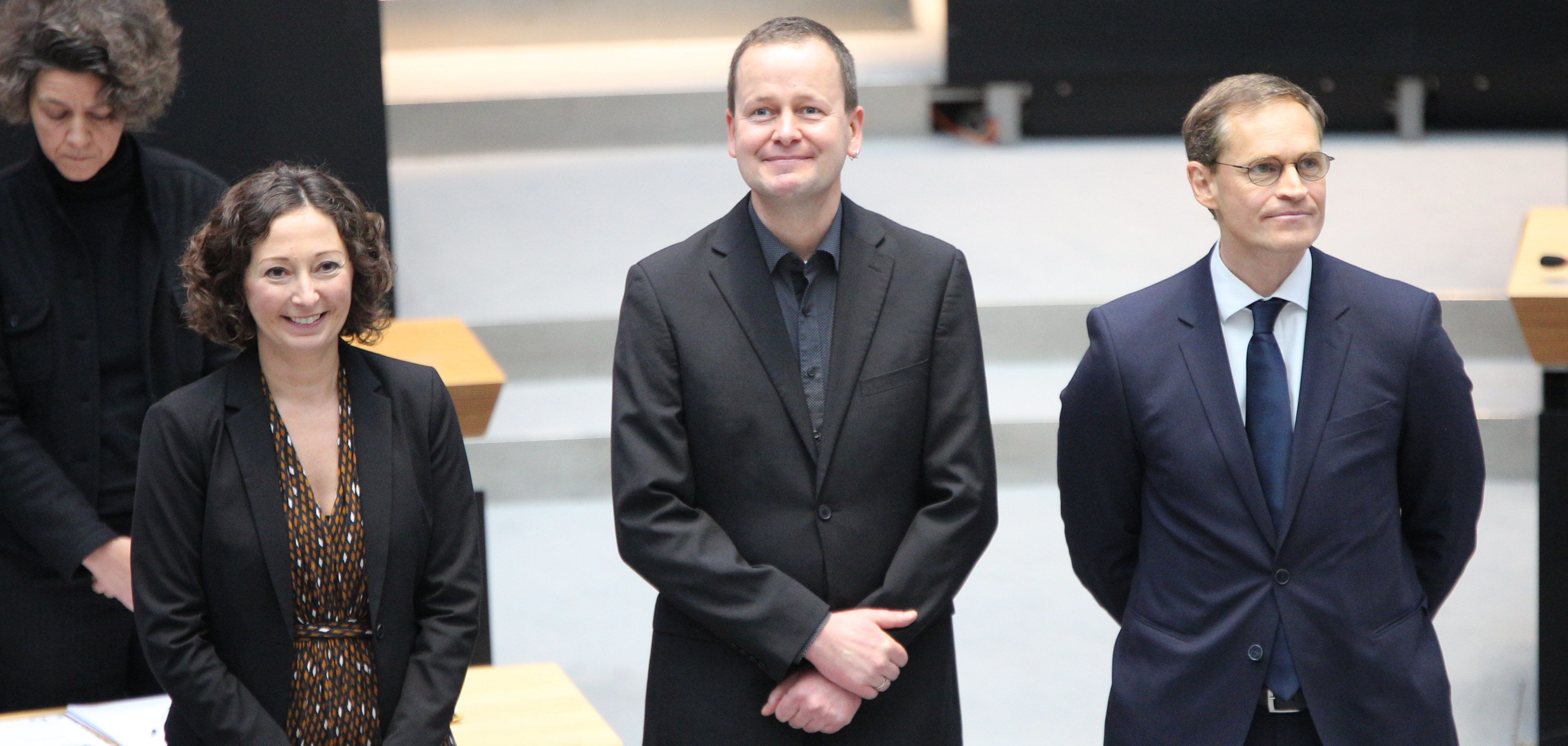
- Left to right: Ramona Pop, Klaus Lederer, and Michael Müller at the Abgeordnetenhaus of Berlin plenary session on 8 December 2016
- Date formed: 8 December 2016
- Date dissolved: 20 December 2021

People and organisations
- Governing Mayor: Michael Müller
- Deputy Mayor: Klaus Lederer; Ramona Pop
- No. of ministers: 10
- Member parties: Social Democratic Party; The Left; Alliance 90/The Greens
- Status in legislature: Coalition government (Majority)
- Opposition parties: Christian Democratic Union; Alternative for Germany; Free Democratic Party

History
- Election: 2016 Berlin state election
- Legislature term: 18th Abgeordnetenhaus of Berlin
- Predecessor: First Müller senate
- Successor: Giffey senate

The second Müller senate was the state government of Berlin between 2016 and 2021, sworn in on 8 December 2016 after Michael Müller was elected as Governing Mayor by the members of the Abgeordnetenhaus of Berlin. It was the 27th Senate of Berlin.

It was formed after the 2016 Berlin state election by the Social Democratic Party (SPD), The Left (LINKE) and Alliance 90/The Greens (GRÜNE). Excluding the Governing Mayor, the senate comprised ten members, called Senators. Four were members of the SPD, three were members of The Left, and three were members of the Greens.

The second Müller senate was succeeded by the Giffey senate on 21 December 2021.

== Formation ==
The previous Senate was a grand coalition government of the SPD and CDU led by Governing Mayor Michael Müller, who took office in December 2014.

The election took place on 18 September 2016, and resulted in significant losses for both governing parties. The Left improved to third place and the Greens saw a decline, while the AfD debuted at 14% and the FDP re-entered the Abgeordnetenhaus in sixth place. As a result of their losses, the SPD and CDU fell short of a majority, bringing the grand coalition to an end. Müller voiced his preference for a government with the Left and Greens; during the campaign, both the SPD and Greens had ruled out a coalition with the CDU.

On 26 September, Müller announced that he would seek exploratory talks between the SPD, Left, and Greens. Negotiations began on 6 October.

After intensive discussions, the three parties presented their 251-page coalition programme on 16 November. It was approved by the Greens at a party congress on 5 December, receiving only two votes against; the SPD followed on 6 December with almost 90% approval. The Left held a membership ballot on the coalition, with 89.3% of members voting in favour.

The Abgeordnetenhaus elected Müller as Governing Mayor on 8 December, winning 88 votes out of 158 cast.

== Composition ==
The composition of the Senate at the time of its dissolution was as follows:

Portfolio	Senator	Party	Took office	Left office	State secretaries
Governing Mayor of Berlin; Senate Chancellery	Michael Müller born 9 December 1964	SPD	8 December 2016	20 December 2021	Christian Gaebler (Head of the Senate Chancellery and Media); Sawsan Chebli (Civic Engagement and Int'l Affairs, Representative to the Federal Government); Frank Nägele (Administrative and Infrastructure Modernisation/Growing City)
Deputy Mayor Senator for Culture and Europe	Klaus Lederer born 21 March 1974	LINKE	8 December 2016	20 December 2021	Torsten Wöhlert (Culture); Gerry Woop (Europe)
Deputy Mayor Senator for Economics, Energy and Enterprise	Ramona Pop born 31 October 1977	GRÜNE	8 December 2016	20 December 2021	Barbro Dreher (Economics); Christian Rickerts (Digitalisation)
Senator for Interior and Sport	Andreas Geisel born 1 March 1966	SPD	8 December 2016	20 December 2021	Torsten Akmann (Interior); Aleksander Dzembritzki (Sport); Sabine Smentek (Information Technology)
Senator for Education, Youth and Family	Sandra Scheeres born 15 February 1970	SPD	8 December 2016	20 December 2021	Beate Stoffers (Education); Sigrid Klebba (Youth and Family)
Senator for Finance	Matthias Kollatz-Ahnen born 24 September 1957	SPD	8 December 2016	20 December 2021	Vera Junker (Assets, Investment, Tax Administration and Personnel); Fréderic Verrycken (Budget and Finance Policy)
Senator for Health, Nursing and Equality	Dilek Kalayci born 7 February 1967	SPD	8 December 2016	20 December 2021	Martin Matz (Health); Barbara König (Equality)
Senator for Integration, Labour and Social Affairs	Elke Breitenbach born 30 March 1961	LINKE	8 December 2016	20 December 2021	Alexander Fischer (Labour and Social Affairs); Daniel Tietze (Integration)
Senator for Urban Development and Housing	Katrin Lompscher born 7 April 1962	LINKE	8 December 2016	2 August 2020	Regula Lüscher (Urban Development and Senate Construction Director); Sebastian Scheel (Housing)
Senator for Urban Development and Housing	Sebastian Scheel born 7 December 1975	LINKE	20 August 2020	20 December 2021	Regula Lüscher (Urban Development and Senate Construction Director); Wenke Christoph (Housing)
Senator for Justice, Consumer Protection and Anti-Discrimination	Dirk Behrendt born 5 August 1971	GRÜNE	8 December 2016	20 December 2021	Daniela Brückner (Justice); Margit Gottstein (Consumer Protection and Anti-Discrimination)
Senator for Environment, Transport and Climate Protection	Regine Günther born 26 December 1962	GRÜNE (Note: Independent nominated by the Greens until 20 June 2019)	8 December 2016	20 December 2021	Stefan Tidow (Environment and Climate Protection); Ingmar Streese (Transport)
