= Tuba Bozkurt =

German politician (born 1983)

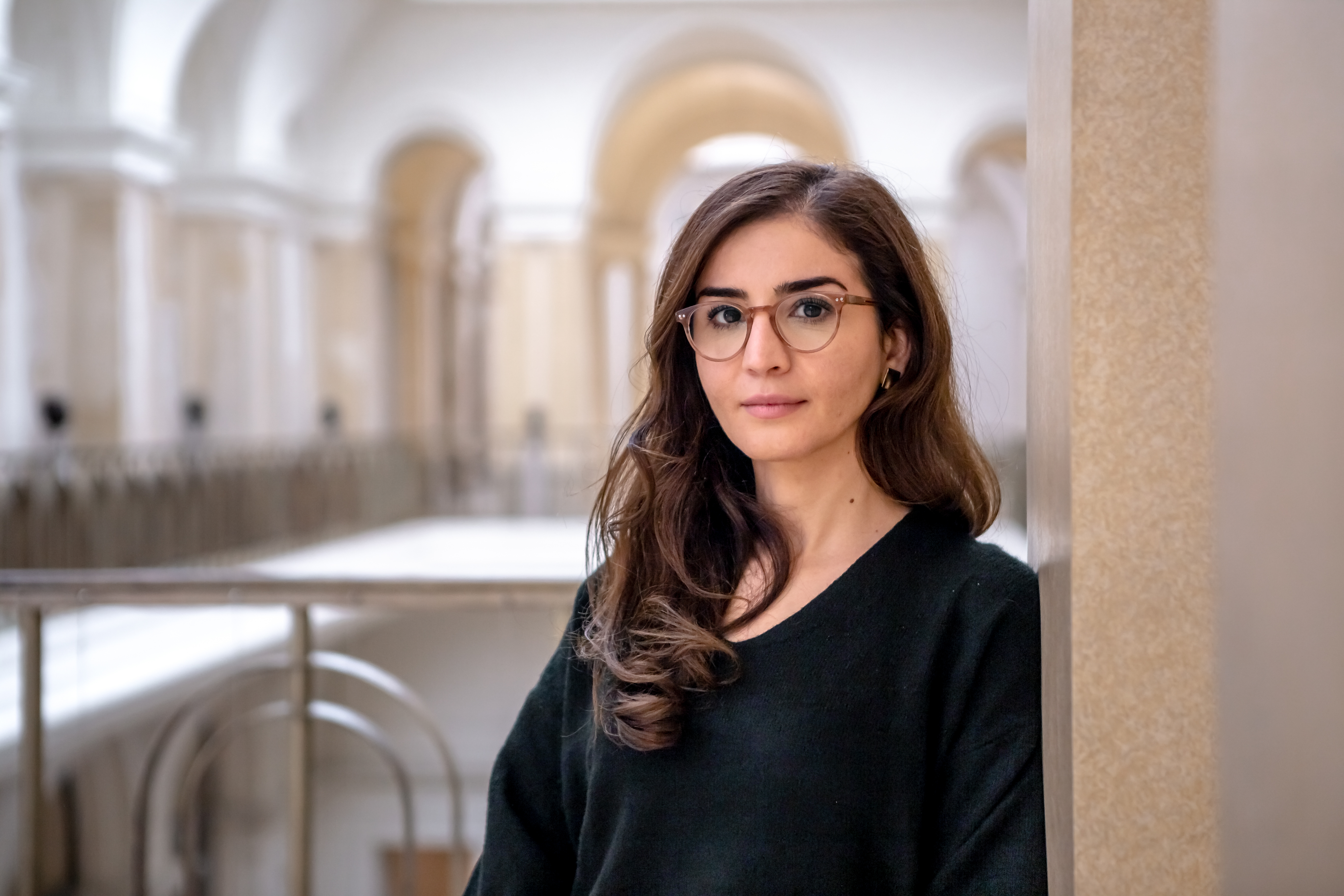
- Tuba Bozkurt in 2021

Member of the Abgeordnetenhaus of Berlin
- Incumbent
- Assumed office 2021

Personal details
- Born: 1983 (age 42–43) Lübeck, West Germany
- Party: Alliance 90/The Greens
- Education: Technical University of Darmstadt; Autonomous University of Barcelona
- Website: http://tubabozkurt.de/

Tuba Bozkurt (born 1983) is a German politician from the Alliance 90/The Greens. She has been a member of the Abgeordnetenhaus of Berlin since 2021.

== Biography ==
Bozkurt's grandparents came to West Germany from Turkey as guest workers. Tuba Bozkurt was born in Lübeck and grew up in the Southern Palatinate. After finishing school, she first completed an apprenticeship as a foreign language assistant in Mannheim, then graduated from high school in Bruchsal. From at least 2007 to 2009, she studied political science at the Technical University of Darmstadt and at the Autonomous University of Barcelona; it is not known whether she graduated. In 2011, she completed an internship at the Heinrich Böll Foundation in Tel Aviv.

In her application for the state list for the 2021 Berlin state election, she stated that she was a consultant for digital transformation and had worked in the digital economy since 2014.

She lives in Berlin-Wedding.

== Political career ==
Bozkurt joined the Green Party (Alliance 90/The Greens) in 2009 while studying . In the Berlin state association, she is one of two volunteer anti-discrimination officers, and in the Berlin district of Mitte, she is the spokesperson for the working group on anti-racism and diversity.

For the 2021 Berlin state election, the Green Party's Mitte district association nominated Bozkurt for a direct mandate in the Berlin Mitte 6 constituency, she did not receive a place on the state list. She won the constituency with 29.8 percent of the first-preference votes, marking the first time the Greens had won. She was re-elected in the 2023 Berlin state election. In the Berlin House of Representatives, she is her parliamentary group's spokesperson for industry and the digital economy, as well as spokesperson for anti-discrimination. She is also a member of the Committee on Integration, Women and Equality, Diversity and Anti-Discrimination, and a member of the Committee on Economic Affairs, Energy and Public Enterprises.

=== Interjection scandal ===
In June 2024, during a question period in the Abgeordnetenhaus of Berlin regarding the knife attack in Mannheim on May 31, 2024, and its fatality, Interior Senator Iris Spranger began a sentence with "The terrible death in Mannheim shows us, of course…", Bozkurt responded with the interjection, intended as a joke, "Mannheim is dead?". The co-chairs of the Green Party parliamentary group, Werner Graf and Bettina Jarasch, the federal chair of the Green Party, Omid Nouripour , and finally Bozkurt himself, subsequently issued public apologies for the "inappropriate," "indecent," and "disrespectful" behavior. Berlin Green Party politician Marianne Birthler called for Bozkurt's resignation. As a consequence, Bozkurt resigned her seat on the Presidium of the House of Representatives.
