= HWR =

HWR may refer to:

== Technology ==
- Handwriting recognition, of a computer
- Heavy-water reactor, a type of nuclear reactor

== Other uses ==
- Berlin School of Economics and Law (German: Hochschule für Wirtschaft und Recht)
- Hereford and Worcester (Chapman code), former county in England
- Henley Women's Regatta, a rowing regatta in England
- Heroes Wear Red, a South African rock band
