= Ulrike Gote =

German politician

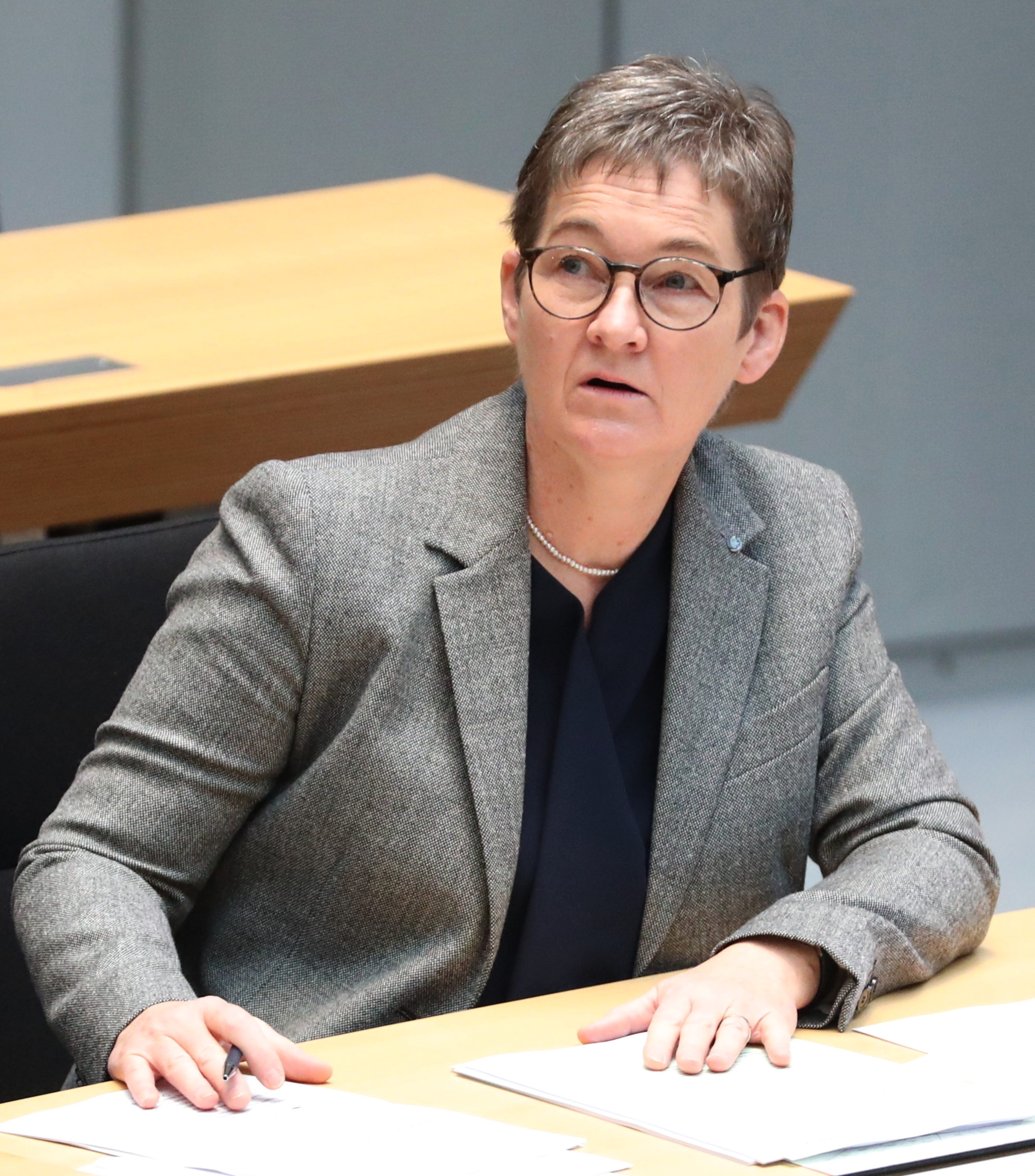
- Gote in 2021

Senator for Science, Health, Nursing and Equality of Berlin
- In office 21 December 2021 – 27 April 2023
- Governing Mayor: Franziska Giffey
- Preceded by: Dilek Kalayci
- Succeeded by: Ina Czyborra

Vice-President of the Landtag of Bavaria (on proposal of the Greens group)
- In office 7 October 2013 – 4 November 2018
- Preceded by: Christine Stahl
- Succeeded by: Thomas Gehring

Member of the Landtag of Bavaria
- In office 28 September 1998 – 4 November 2018
- Constituency: Upper Franconia

Personal details
- Born: Ulrike Gote; 26 October 1965 (age 60) Trier, Rhineland-Palatinate, West Germany
- Party: Alliance 90/The Greens

Ulrike Gote (born 26 October 1965) is a German politician of Alliance 90/The Greens who served as State Minister (Senator) for Science, Health, Nursing and Equality in the government of Governing Mayor of Berlin Franziska Giffey from December 2021 to April 2023.

Previously, Gote was city councillor for youth, women, health and education of the municipal government of Kassel from 2019 to 2021. She was active in Bavarian state politics from 1998 to 2019, serving in various positions including parliamentary manager of the Greens in the State Parliament of Bavaria from 2003 to 2013, and Vice President of the State Parliament from 2013 to 2018.

== Education and personal life ==
After graduating from high school in 1985, Gote studied Earth science in Bayreuth, Heidelberg, and Norwich, graduating in 1994 with a degree in geoecology, specializing in hydrology. She was a scholarship holder of the Cusanuswerk.

Gote is married and has three children.

== Political career ==
=== Bavarian politics ===
Gote was elected to the State Parliament of Bavaria in the 1998 Bavarian state election. She was the only Green deputy elected in Upper Franconia, and thus had the responsibility of representing the entire region. During her first term, she was her parliamentary group's spokeswoman for European policy.

Gote served as manager for the Green Party's parliamentary group from 2003 to 2013. During this period, she was also spokeswoman for education, media, and religious policy. She became a member of the Higher Education, Research and Culture Committee and became the first Green member of the State Committee of Catholics. In 2008, she joined the Bavarian regulatory authority as a media councillor. She was also representative of the Greens on the State Council for Monuments from 2006 to 2013.

After the 2013 Bavarian state election, Gote was elected as vice-president of the State Parliament for the Greens. In addition to her existing her posts as spokeswoman for media and religion, she also became legal policy spokeswoman for the Greens. During her term as vice-president, she was involved in the inquiry into the "model car affair" involving former minister Christine Haderthauer and her husband. Gote did not run for re-election in the 2018 Bavarian state election. In February 2019, she replaced Tim Pargent on the Bayreuth city council.

=== Kassel local politics ===
From August 2019 to December 2021, Gote served as City Councillor for Youth, Women, Health and Education in the municipal government of Kassel. She succeeded Anne Janz, who had resigned to became state secretary in the Hessian government.

=== Senator of Berlin ===
On 21 December 2021, Gote was appointed State Minister (Senator) for Science, Health, Care and Equality in the Giffey senate. She took over the position from Dilek Kalayci of the SPD.

== Other engagements ==
Gote has been involved in church youth work, the anti-nuclear movement, the anti-apartheid movement, and with Amnesty International. She is also a member of various other associations, including Bavarian League for Nature Protection and the Transit Club of Germany.

Gote is also honorary chairwoman of AVALON Prevention and deputy chairwoman of the AVALON Helpline and Consultation Centre Against Sexual Violence. From 2013 to 2017, Gote was a member of the board of directors of the Bayreuth branch of Caritas Internationalis; she is now deputy chairwoman of the supervisory board. Gote is chairwoman of the Bayreuth city association and a member of the board of the Upper Franconian regional branch of Alliance 90/The Greens.

Gote's board memberships include:

- Berlin School of Economics and Law, Member of the Board of Trustees (2021–2023)
- Berlin University of Applied Sciences and Technology, Member of the Board of Trustees (2021–2023)
- Berlin University of the Arts (UdK), Member of the Board of Trustees (2021–2023)
- Free University of Berlin, Member of the Board of Trustees (2021–2023)
- Hochschule für Musik Hanns Eisler Berlin, Member of the Council (2021–2023)
- HTW Berlin, Member of the Board of Trustees (2021–2023)
- Humboldt University of Berlin, Member of the Board of Trustees (2021–2023)
- Technische Universität Berlin, Member of the Board of Trustees (2021–2023)
