= Astrid-Sabine Busse =

German politician (born 1957)

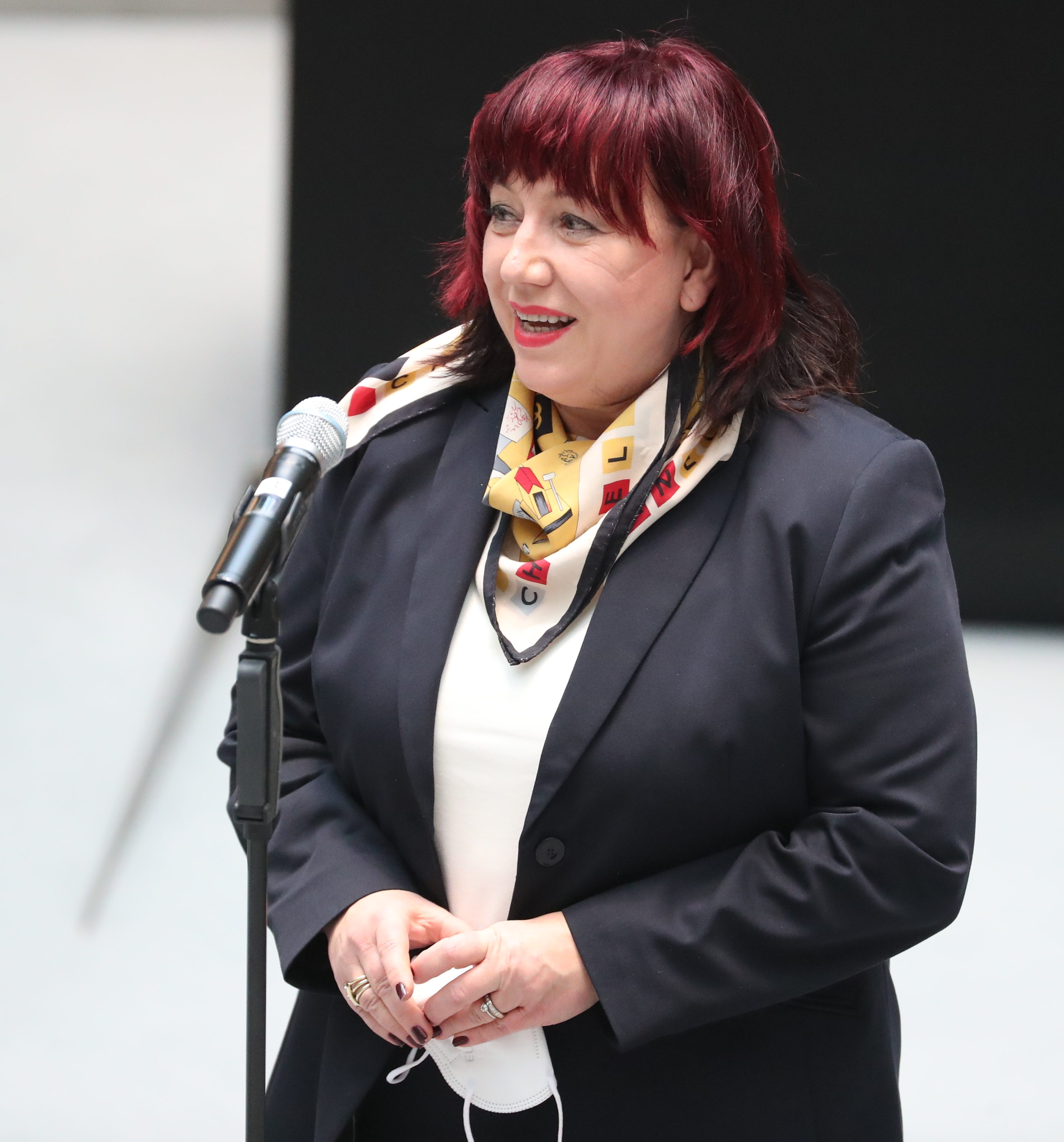
- Busse in 2021

Senator for Education, Youth and Family of Berlin
- Incumbent
- Assumed office 21 December 2021
- Governing Mayor: Franziska Giffey
- Preceded by: Sandra Scheeres

Personal details
- Born: Astrid-Sabine Busse; 23 October 1957 (age 68) Tempelhof, West Berlin
- Party: SPD

Astrid-Sabine Busse (born 23 October 1957) is a German educator and politician of the Social Democratic Party (SPD) who is serving as Senator for Education, Youth and Family in the Berlin state government since December 2021. Prior, she was chaired the Association of Berlin School Boards from 2015 to 2021.

== Early life and educational career ==
Busse started school at the Tempelhofer Feld elementary school in 1965, then attended the Luise-Henriette Gymnasium in Alt-Tempelhof. She studied geography and political science at the Berlin University of Education from 1976 to 1980, completing her teacher training at an elementary school in Marienfelde from 1982 to 1984. She then taught at the Hans-Fallada-Schule special school, among other places, until 1992.

Busse was principal of the elementary school in Köllnische Heide from 1992 to 2021. From 2015 to 2021, she was the chairwoman of the Association of Berlin School Boards.

== Political career ==
On 21 December 2021, Busse was appointed Senator for Education, Youth and Family in the Giffey senate. She succeeded Senator Sandra Scheeres (SPD), who held the post for ten years. Busse joined the SPD less than a week before joining the Senate.

Busse is considered a long-time supporter of the reintroduction of Beamter status for teachers in Berlin, which was abolished in 2004. Upon taking office, she emphasised her belief that such a reform would be essential to solving the shortage of teachers in Berlin. The government's coalition agreement included a commitment to reintroduce Beamter status for teachers starting from 2023 to 2024, after years of controversial debate over the issue. As of 2021, Berlin was the only state in Germany that did not permit teachers to be employed as Beamter.
