= Daniel Wesener =

German politician (born 1975)

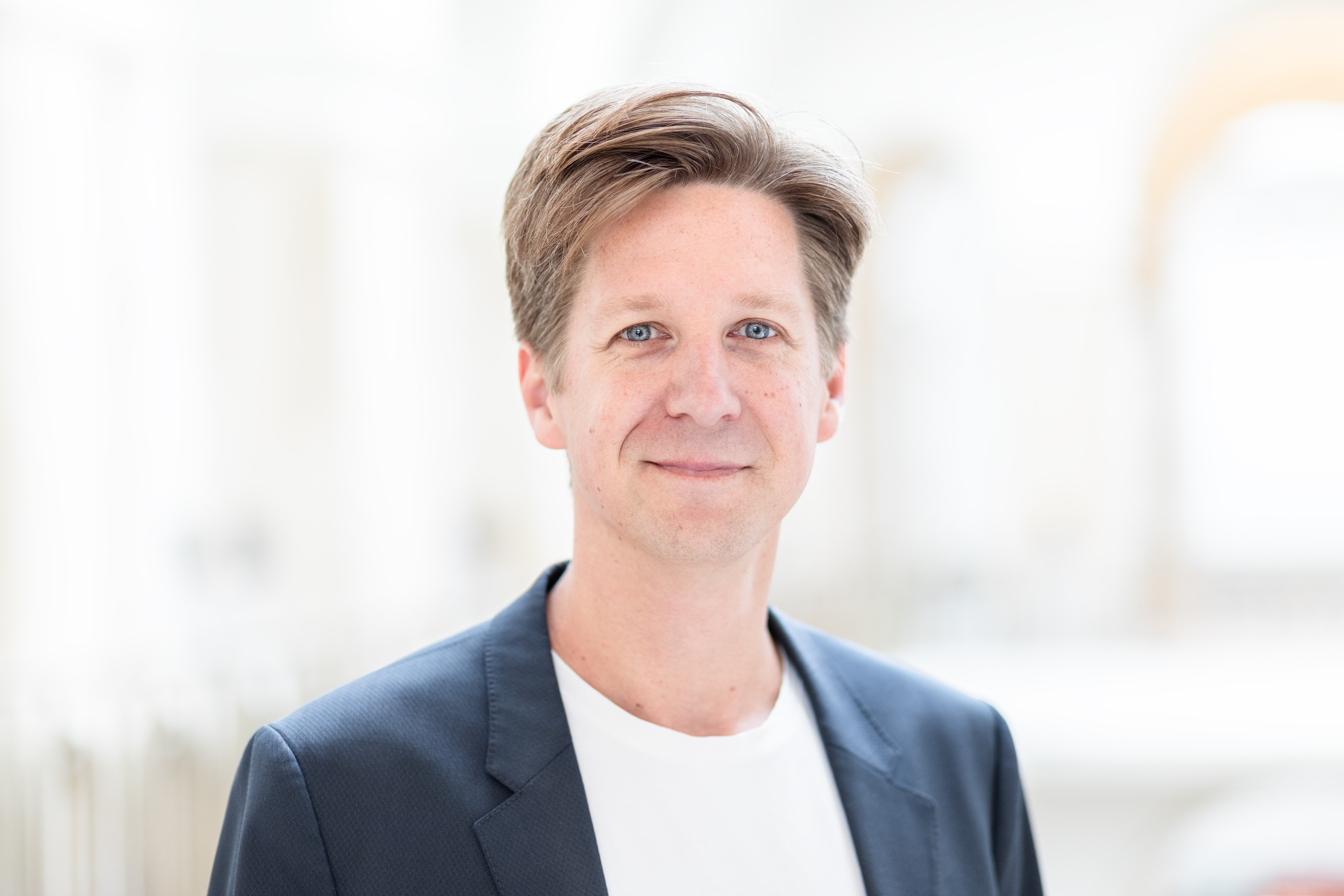
- Wesener in 2019

Senator for Finance of Berlin
- In office 21 December 2021 – 27 April 2023
- Governing Mayor: Franziska Giffey
- Preceded by: Matthias Kollatz
- Succeeded by: Stefan Evers

Member of the Abgeordnetenhaus of Berlin
- In office 18 September 2016 – 2 January 2022
- Succeeded by: Catrin Wahlen

Personal details
- Born: Daniel Wesener; 5 December 1975 (age 50) Hamburg, West Germany
- Party: Alliance 90/The Greens
- Education: Humboldt University of Berlin

Daniel Wesener (born 5 December 1975) is a German politician of the Alliance 90/The Greens who served as State Minister (Senator) for Finance in the government of Governing Mayor Franziska Giffey of Berlin from December 2021 to April 2023. He was previously state chairman of the Greens from 2011 to 2017, and a member of the State Parliament of Berlin from 2016 to 2022.

== Early life and education ==
Wesener was born and grew up in Hamburg. After graduating from the Albert-Schweitzer-Gymnasium and completing community service, he moved to Berlin in 1996. He studied history and art history at the Humboldt University of Berlin and at the College of William & Mary in the United States, and was a scholarship holder of the Evangelisches Studienwerk Villigst. He finished his studies without a degree and worked in the office of Christian Ströbele, member of the Bundestag for the Greens, from 2003 to 2011.

== Political career ==
Wesener has been a member of the Greens since 2001. In 2006, he was elected to the municipal council of Friedrichshain-Kreuzberg, where he co-chaired the Greens group with Antje Kapek until 2011.

In March 2011, Wesener was elected co-chairman of the Berlin Greens alongside Bettina Jarasch. The two led the coalition negotiations with the SPD under Governing Mayor Klaus Wowereit after the 2011 Berlin state election. Wesener and Jarasch were re-elected as co-leaders in March 2013, achieving an unusually broad support among delegates at the party conference. Wesener won 95.4% of votes, the largest majority for any leader up to that point. He was again re-elected in 2015 with 92% of the vote.

Wesener is considered a representative of the left wing of the Greens. In 2013, he identified himself as a libertarian leftist, and stated that he had stayed distant from party politics for a long time. He was motivated to join the Greens during the "patriotism debate" in the CDU in 2001, fearing a "sociopolitical rollback".

In October 2015, Wesener was nominated as part of a four-member team of lead candidates for the 2016 Berlin state election alongside Bettina Jarasch, Antje Kapek, and Ramona Pop. Wesener was placed fourth on the state-wide party list, and was elected to the Abgeordnetenhaus. In the Greens faction, he was parliamentary managing officer and spokesman for culture, budget, and finance.

Wesener was again fourth on the Greens list for the 2021 Berlin state election, and was re-elected. He was subsequently appointed Senator for Finance in the Giffey senate, taking over the role from outgoing SPD senator Matthias Kollatz. In accordance with the principle of separation of mandates, Wesener resigned from the Abgeordnetenhaus at the beginning of 2022, and was succeeded by Catrin Wahlen.

== Personal life ==
Wesener lives with his partner Dirk Behrendt in Kreuzberg.
