= Catrin Wahlen =

German politician

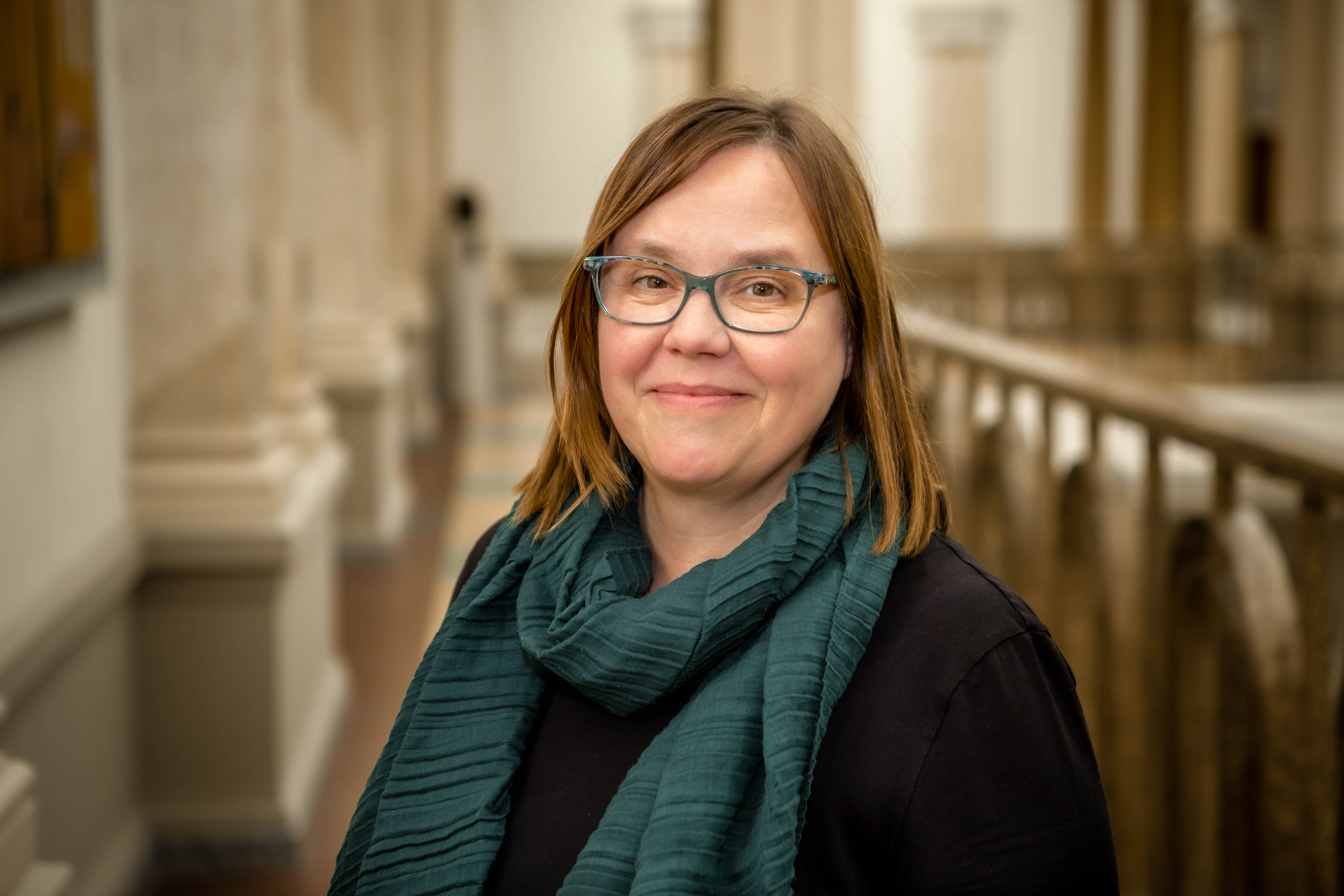
- Catrin Wahlen in 2022

Member of the Berlin House of Representatives
- Incumbent
- Assumed office 2022

Personal details
- Born: 1972 (age 53–54) Winnenden
- Party: Alliance 90/The Greens
- Website: catrin-wahlen.de

Catrin Wahlen (born 1972 in Winnenden) is a German politician from the Alliance 90/The Greens. She has been a member of the Berlin House of Representatives since 2022.

== Biography ==
Wahlen was born into a German-Finnish family. She grew up in Finland and graduated from high school there in 1991. She then studied human geography at the University of Oulu and One World Studies at the University of Helsinki, though she did not complete either degree. She has lived in Berlin since 1999, and in the Treptow-Köpenick district since 2004. She has worked in various jobs, including saleswoman, cleaner, secretary, coordinator, and English teacher. Most recently, she worked in the constituency office of Harald Moritz.

== Political career ==
Wahlen was a district councillor in the Treptow-Köpenick district assembly from 2016 to 2021. She then ran unsuccessfully in the 2021 Berlin state election in the Treptow-Köpenick 1 constituency. On 3 January 2022, she entered the Berlin House of Representatives via her party's state list, replacing the departing representative Daniel Wesener. In the 2023 Berlin state election, she retained her seat in the House of Representatives.

Wahlen is a member of the parliamentary group of the non-partisan Europa-Union Berlin (EUB), which advocates for a federal Europe and the European integration process.
