= Bettina Jarasch =

German politician

Bettina Jarasch MdA
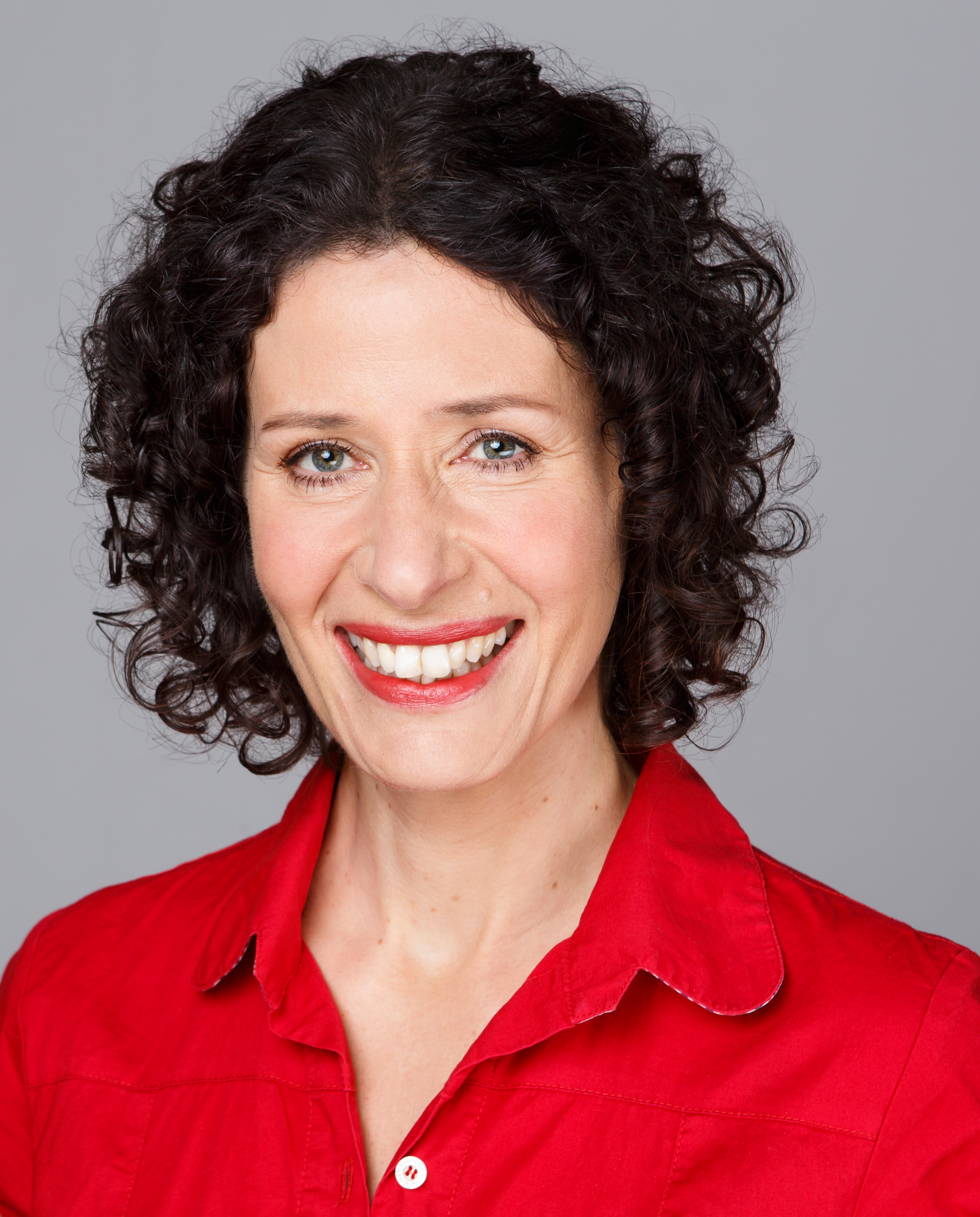
- Jarasch in 2014

Leader of Alliance 90/The Greens in the Abgeordnetenhaus of Berlin
- Incumbent
- Assumed office 14 March 2023 Serving with Werner Graf
- Preceded by: Silke Gebel

Leader of Alliance 90/The Greens in Berlin
- In office 6 March 2011 – 12 December 2016 Serving with Daniel Wesener
- Preceded by: Irmgard Franke-Dressler & Stefan Gelbhaar
- Succeeded by: Nina Stahr & Werner Graf
Berlin Cabinet
Deputy Governing Mayor of Berlin
In office 21 December 2021 – 27 April 2023 Serving with Klaus Lederer
Governing Mayor	Franziska Giffey
Preceded by	Ramona Pop
Succeeded by	Franziska Giffey
Senator for Environment, Climate Protection, Mobility and Consumer Protection of Berlin
In office 21 December 2021 – 27 April 2023
Governing Mayor	Franziska Giffey
Preceded by	Regine Günther
Succeeded by	Manja Schreiner

Member of the Abgeordnetenhaus of Berlin
- Incumbent
- Assumed office 16 March 2023
- In office 18 September 2016 – 2 January 2022

Personal details
- Born: Bettina Hartmann; 22 November 1968 (age 57) Augsburg, Bavaria, West Germany
- Party: Alliance 90/The Greens
- Children: 2

Bettina Jarasch (née Hartmann, born 22 November 1968) is a German politician of Alliance 90/The Greens who has served as co-leader of the Greens parliamentary group in the Berlin House of Representatives alongside Werner Graf since 2023. She previously led the Berlin state branch of the Greens from 2011 to 2016.

Between 2021 and 2023, she served as Deputy Governing Mayor of Berlin and Senator for Environment, Climate Protection, Mobility and Consumer Protection in the Senate of Franziska Giffey.

== Early life and education ==
Jarasch is the daughter of Helmut Hartmann (Unternehmer) [Helmut Hartmann], entrepreneur and former member of the Senate of Bavaria. She studied philosophy and political science at the Free University of Berlin.

== Early career ==
Early in her career, Jarasch worked as an editor, consultant, and author. She was an advisor to the Alliance 90/The Greens parliamentary group in the German Bundestag from 2000 to 2009; until 2005 for MdB Christa Nickels, and thereafter for parliamentary leader Renate Künast.

== Political career ==
=== Career in state politics ===
In 2009, Jarasch became a member of the Green Party's leadership in Berlin, and was spokeswoman for education.

On 6 March 2011, Jarasch was elected co-leader of the Berlin Greens alongside Daniel Wesener. In 2013, she was elected to the federal Greens executive, becoming head of the party's commission for "religious communities, ideologies, and the state". She left this office in 2018.

Jarasch was one of a four lead candidates for the Greens in the 2016 Berlin state election. She was placed third on the party list behind Ramona Pop and Antje Kapek, and ahead of fellow co-leader Daniel Wesener, and was elected to the Abgeordnetenhaus. At the end of the year, she and Wesener left office as co-leaders.

Jarasch ran for the top position on the Berlin state list in the 2017 federal election after Renate Künast indicated she would accept third place. She was challenged by Lisa Paus for the position, and was defeated 798 votes to 308. She subsequently did not run for election to the Bundestag.

On 5 October 2020, Jarasch was nominated by the Berlin party leadership as lead candidate for the 2021 state election. Her nomination was received with surprise, as Senator Ramona Pop and parliamentary group leader Antje Kapek had been considered the most likely candidates. RBB attributed this to division within the party surrounding Pop and Kapek which allowed Jarasch to secure the nomination. At a party conference on 12 December, Jarasch was formally elected as the top candidate, receiving 142 votes in favour, none against, and five abstentions.

Jarasch declared that she sought to make the Greens the biggest party in the Abgeordnetenhaus, and to become the first Green Governing Mayor of Berlin. This reflected opinion polling, which showed the Greens consistently in first place since the end of 2018. She expressed her satisfaction with the incumbent SPD–Left–Green coalition, and spoke poorly of the Christian Democratic Union, indicating she may not seek an agreement with the CDU as other branches of the Greens have.

The Greens placed second in the 2021 Berlin state election, winning 18.9% of votes compared to 21.4% for the SPD and 18.0% for the CDU. Post-election, Jarasch spoke out in favour of renewing the incumbent coalition. After a new SPD–Green–Left government was negotiated, Jarasch became Deputy Governing Mayor and Senator for Environment, Mobility, Consumer and Climate Protection in the Giffey senate on 21 December.

=== Role in national politics ===
Jarasch was nominated by her party as delegate to the Federal Convention for the purpose of electing the President of Germany in 2017 and 2022.

== Church engagement ==
Jarasch is active within the Catholic Church, and has been the leader of the pastoral council of the St. Marien-Liebfrauen congregation in Berlin-Kreuzberg for many years. In November 2016, the Central Committee of German Catholics elected Jarasch as one of 45 distinguished persons. On 24 November 2017, she was elected spokesperson for the "Basic Political and Ethical Issues" department in the Central Committee.

Alongside eight other theologians and well-known Catholics, in February 2019, Jarasch penned an open letter to Cardinal Reinhard Marx. The signatories called for a "new start in regard to sexual morality", including "reasonable and just assessment of homosexuality", "real separation of powers" in the church, and curbing the excesses of the ordination office and opening it to women. They appealed to the German Bishops' Conference to give diocesan priests the freedom to choose their way of life, "so that celibacy can again credibly refer to the kingdom of heaven".

== Political positions ==
Jarasch is considered a member of the moderate Realo wing of the party.

== Personal life ==
Jarasch is married to journalist Oliver Jarasch, who is a department head at Rundfunk Berlin-Brandenburg. They have two children.
