= Stephan Schwarz =

German politician

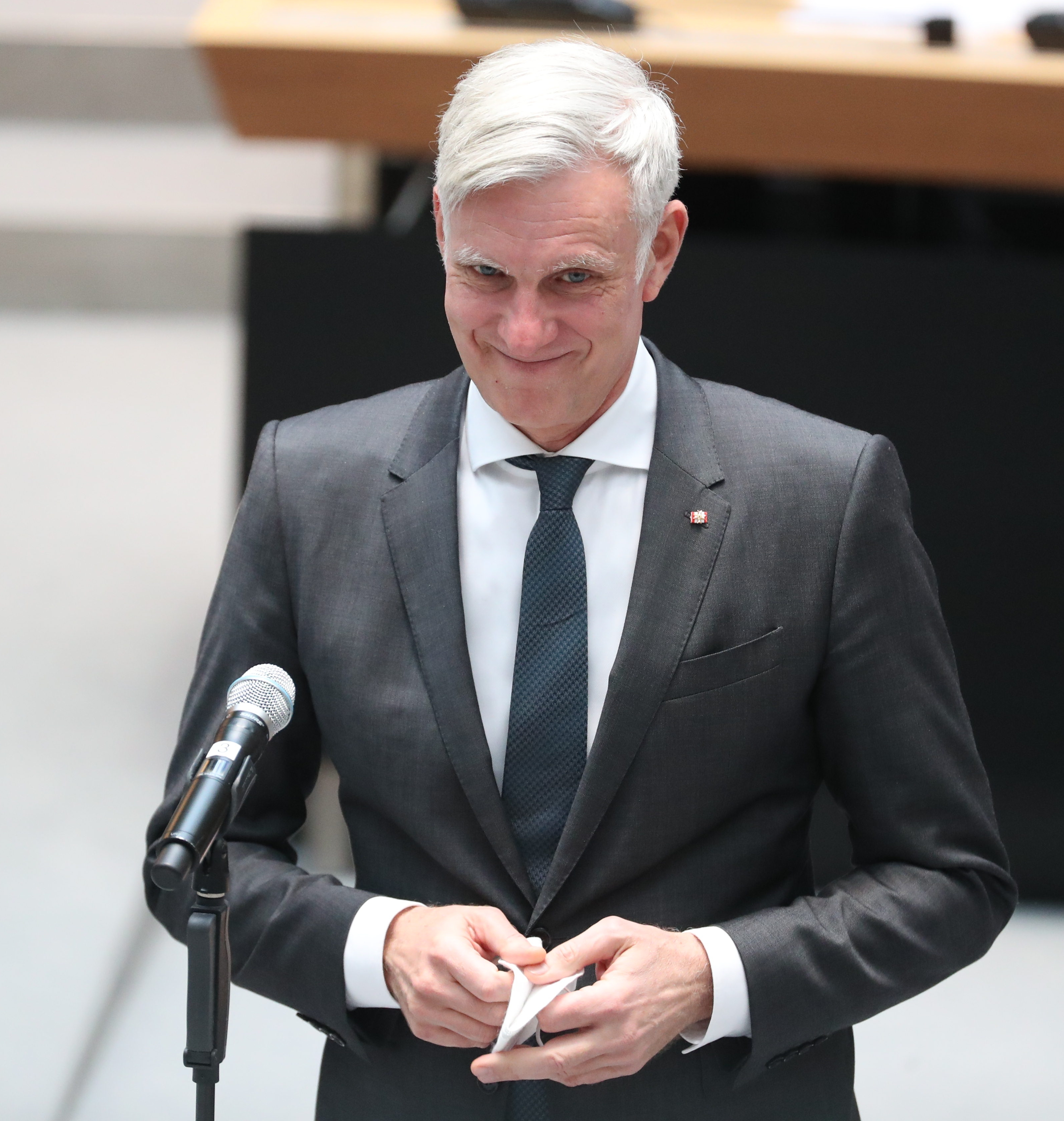
- Schwarz in 2021

Senator for Economy, Energy and Enterprise of Berlin
- In office 21 December 2021 – 27 April 2023
- Governing Mayor: Franziska Giffey
- Preceded by: Ramona Pop
- Succeeded by: Franziska Giffey

Personal details
- Born: Stephan Schwarz; 15 May 1965 (age 61) West Berlin
- Party: Independent
- Education: Free University of Berlin; Sorbonne University

Stephan Schwarz (born 15 May 1965) is a German businessman, entrepreneur, and independent politician who served as Senator for Economy, Energy and Enterprise in the Berlin state government from December 2021 to April 2023. He previously co-directed the building cleaning company GRG Services Group with his brother Heiko Schwarz from 1996 to 2021. He served as president of the Berlin Chamber of Crafts from 2003 to 2019. From 2019 to 2021, he was a member of the federal Council of Labour.

== Education and personal life ==
After graduating from the Ernst-Moritz-Arndt-Gymnasium in Berlin in 1983, Schwarz studied philosophy and history at the Free University of Berlin until 1986, then at the Université de Paris IV (Sorbonne University) from 1987 to 1989, from which he graduated with a master's degree. He then remained in Paris and worked for the publishing house L'Arche éditeurs until 1990.

In addition to his work in business, Schwarz is involved in several cultural, scientific, and social organizations. He is chairman of the Julius Lessing Society (affiliated with the Kunstgewerbemuseum Berlin), the ESCP Business School Berlin, and Friends of the Youth Art Association and Cultural Center Schlesische 27. He is a member of the Académie de Berlin, which promotes intellectual and cultural exchange between France and Germany. Schwarz is also a member of the board of friends of Deutsche Oper Berlin.

== Business career ==
After living in Paris, Schwarz returned to Berlin in 1990 and began working in the family business, Großberliner Reinigungs-Gesellschaft KG, which was founded by his grandfather Walter Schwarz in Kreuzberg in 1920. After the death of his father Hans-Jochen, who had run the company since 1970, Stephan was appointed director in 1996. His younger brother Heiko became do-director a few years later, and together they developed the company into its modern form, GRG Services Berlin GmbH & Co. KG. Since taking over the management of the company, Schwarz has been responsible in particular for its development and expansion throughout Germany.

Schwarz was formerly a member of the supervisory boards of several German companies, including Signal Iduna (as deputy chairman), the Berliner Volksbank (as chairman), MKH Michels Kliniken Holding SE (as chairman).

In 2003, Schwarz was appointed President of the Berlin Chamber of Crafts. He for sixteen years until retiring in 2019, after which time he was named honorary chairman. At the end of the same year, he was appointed to the Council of Labour by the federal government. Also in 2019, he became a member of the executive board of the Federal Guild Association of the Building Cleaning Trade.

== Senator of Berlin ==
On 20 December 2021, Schwarz was introduced by the Berlin Social Democratic Party (SPD) as the incoming Senator for Economy, Energy and Enterprise in the Giffey senate. He took office on 21 December, taking over the portfolio from outgoing Vice-Mayor Ramona Pop. At the same time, he resigned from his position as director of GRG Services Group, his board positions on other companies, the Council of Labour and other trade organisations. Schwarz remains unaffiliated with any political party.
