= Andreas Geisel =

German politician

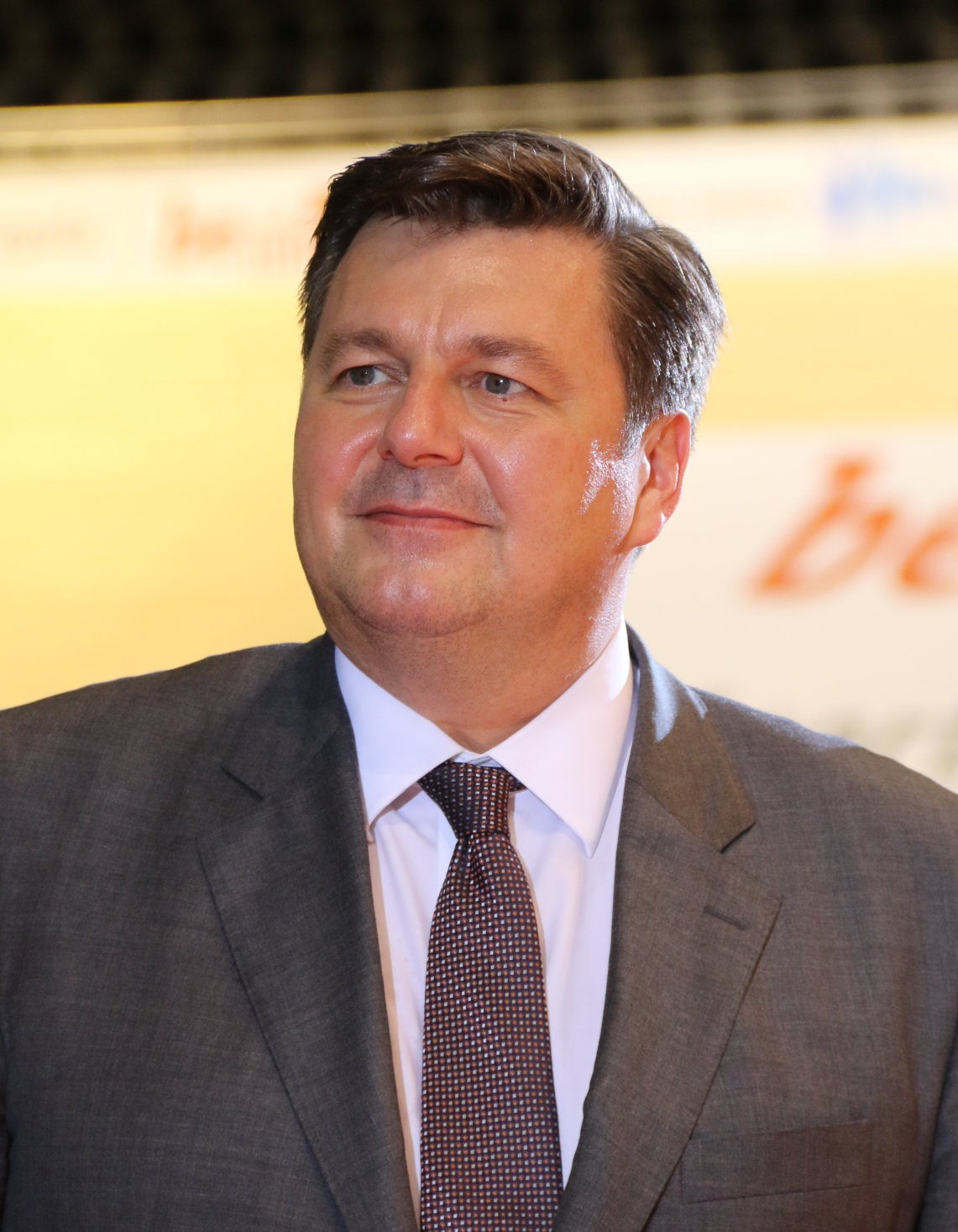
- Geisel in 2017

Senator for Urban Development, Construction and Housing of Berlin
- In office 21 December 2021 – 27 April 2023
- Governing Mayor: Franziska Giffey
- Preceded by: Katrin Lompscher
- Succeeded by: Christian Gaebler

Senator for Interior and Sport of Berlin
- In office 8 December 2016 – 20 December 2021
- Governing Mayor: Michael Müller
- Preceded by: Frank Henkel
- Succeeded by: Iris Spranger

Senator for Urban Development and Environment of Berlin
- In office 11 December 2014 – 8 December 2016
- Governing Mayor: Michael Müller
- Preceded by: Michael Müller
- Succeeded by: Katrin Lompscher (Urban Development); Regine Günther (Environment)

Mayor of Lichtenberg
- In office 10 November 2011 – 11 December 2014
- Preceded by: Christina Emmrich
- Succeeded by: Birgit Monteiro

Personal details
- Born: Andreas Geisel; 1 March 1966 (age 59) East Berlin, East Germany
- Party: Social Democratic Party

Andreas Geisel (born 1 March 1966) is a German politician of the Social Democratic Party (SPD) who served as Senator for Urban Development, Construction and Housing in the Berlin state government from December 2021 to April 2023. Prior, he was Senator for Interior and Sport from 2016 to 2021, and Senator for Urban Development and Environment from 2014 to 2016.

== Early life and education ==
Geisel was born 1 March 1966 in East Berlin.

Geisel attended a polytechnic secondary school in East Berlin between 1972 and 1982. Between 1985 and 1986 Geisel worked a telecommunications technician at the East German Postal Service. From 1986 until 1990 he attended the College of Transportation Friedrich List in Dresden and studied Economics in regard to the media industry. He then worked for Deutsche Telekom in Berlin from 1990 till 1992. He then worked for PricewaterhouseCoopers as a consultant from 1994 until 1995.

== Political career ==
=== Early beginnings ===
In the GDR Geisel was a member of the SED.

After German reunification in 1990 Geisel became a member of the SPD. In 1995 he was elected borough councillor in the Berlin borough of Lichtenberg, an office he held until 2000 and then after the redistricting again but this time for the borough of Lichtenberg-Hohenschönhausen.

In the 2009 national elections, Geisel ran for a seat in the Federal Parliament in the Lichtenberg constituency, he came in second with 18.4% of the vote.

On 10 November 2011, Geisel was elected Mayor of Lichtenberg with the support of the CDU and Alliance 90/The Greens. He was mayor until he was appointed to the Berlin Senate in 2014.

=== Senator of Berlin ===
In 2014, Geisel was appointed Senator for Urban Development and the Environment by new Governing Mayor of Berlin Michael Müller. After the 2016 Berlin state election, Geisel remained in the Senate, taking the portfolio of Interior and Sport. As one of the state's representatives at the Bundesrat, he has been a member of the Committee on Internal Affairs and of the Defence Committee. He is also part of the Conference of Interior Ministers (IMK).

During the COVID-19 pandemic, as stocks of protective gear like face mask become strained, nations have been competing with increased urgency over the short supplies. On 3 April, Geisel accused United States agents of appropriating a shipment of 200,000 face masks meant for German police from the airport in Bangkok. However, these claims haven't been corroborated, and the whereabouts of the shipment remains unclear.

In 2021, Geisel outlawed and dissolved Jama’atu Berlin, a Salafist association also known as Tauhid Berlin, saying the group was advocating terrorist attacks.

After the 2021 Berlin state election, Geisel was appointed Senator for Urban Development, Construction and Housing in the Senate of new Governing Mayor Franziska Giffey.

== Other activities (selection) ==
- Berlin School of Economics and Law (HWR), Member of the Board of Trustees (since 2017)
- Olympiastadion Berlin, Member of the Supervisory Board (since 2016)
- German Forum for Crime Prevention (DFK), Ex-Officio Member of the Board of Trustees (since 2016)
- Business Forum of the Social Democratic Party of Germany, Member of the Political Advisory Board
- Friends of Mies van der Rohe Haus, Member
