= Klaus Lederer =

German politician (born 1974)

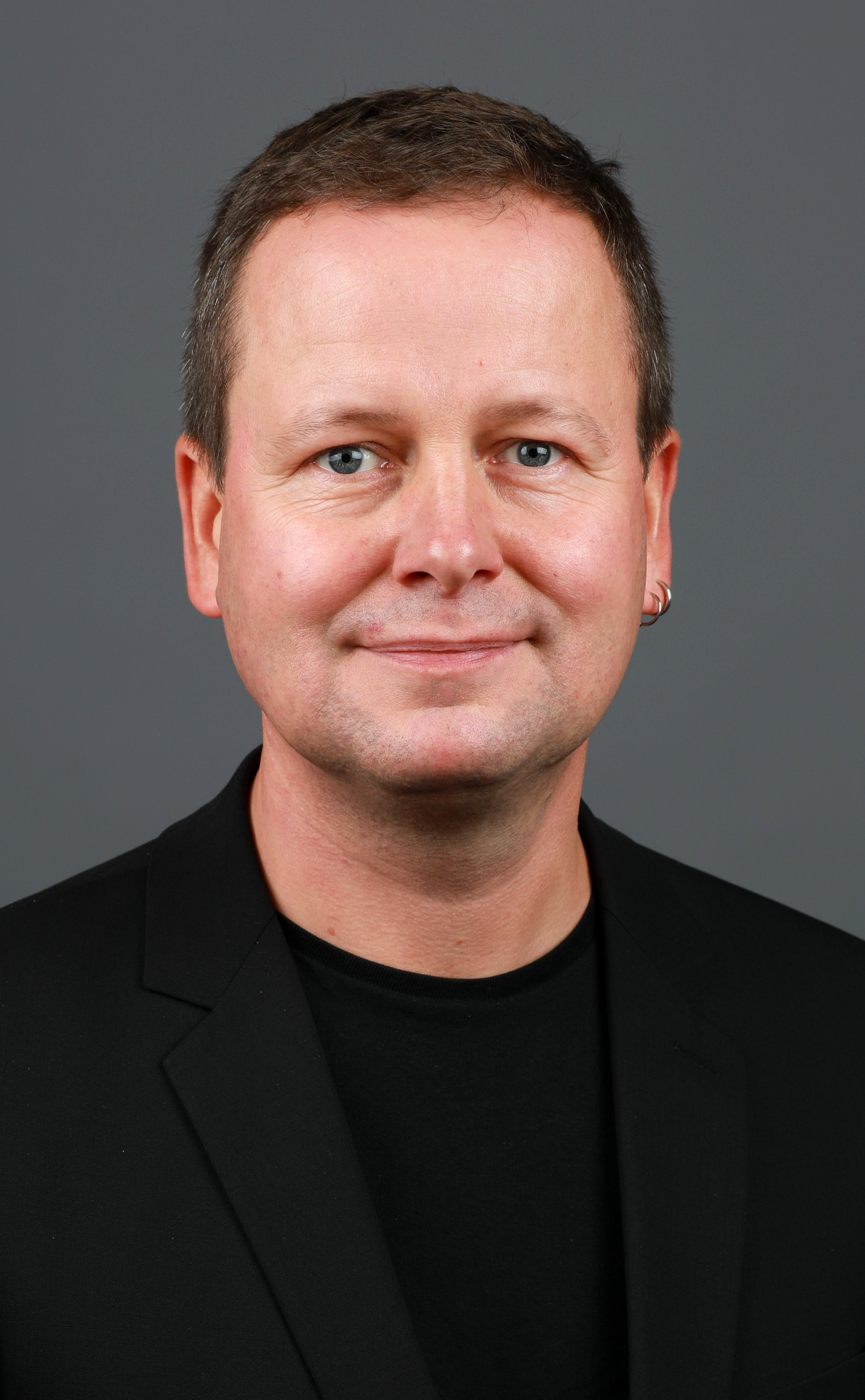
- Lederer in 2017

Deputy Governing Mayor of Berlin
- In office 8 December 2016 – 27 April 2023 Serving with Ramona Pop (until Dec. 2021); Bettina Jarasch (from Dec. 2021)
- Governing Mayor: Michael Müller; Franziska Giffey
- Preceded by: Frank Henkel
- Succeeded by: Stefan Evers

Senator for Culture and Europe of Berlin
- In office 8 December 2016 – 27 April 2023
- Governing Mayor: Michael Müller; Franziska Giffey
- Preceded by: Thomas Flierl (2006)
- Succeeded by: Joe Chialo

Leader of The Left in Berlin
- In office 30 June 2007 – 10 December 2016
- Preceded by: Office established
- Succeeded by: Katina Schubert

Member of the Abgeordnetenhaus of Berlin
- Incumbent
- Assumed office 4 November 2021
- In office 1 January 2003 – 31 January 2017

Personal details
- Born: Klaus Lederer; 21 March 1974 (age 52) Schwerin, East Germany
- Party: Independent
- Education: Humboldt University of Berlin

Klaus Lederer (born 21 March 1974) is a German independent politician (until 2024 The Left, previously PDS) who served as Deputy Mayor and Senator for Culture and Europe in the Berlin state government between December 2016 to April 2023. He is also a member of the Abgeordnetenhaus of Berlin since 2001. He previously served as chairman of the Berlin branch of The Left from 2006 to 2016. He was the lead candidate for his party in the 2016, 2021 and 2023 state elections. He left Die Linke alongside four others in 2024 following an internal conflict surrounding the party's official position on the war in Gaza.

== Early life and education ==
Lederer was born in Schwerin and grew up in Frankfurt an der Oder, where he attended Polytechnic Secondary School. In 1988, the family moved to Hohenschönhausen in Berlin. There he attended Heinrich-Hertz-Oberschule in Friedrichshain, studying mathematics and science and earning his Abitur in 1992. He then spent a year in youth social work before studying law at the Humboldt University of Berlin. He passed the first state law examination in 1998. After his studies, he did one year of civilian service in senior citizen care. He then worked on his dissertation on Privatization in the water sector at the Law Faculty of Humboldt University, where he received his doctorate in 2004. In February 2005, Lederer received the Carl Goerdeler Award from the Carl and Anneliese Goerdeler Foundation Leipzig and the Deutsches Institut für Urbanistik for his doctoral thesis, as well as the John Desmond Bernal Award from the Rosa Luxemburg Foundation Brandenburg. In February 2006, he passed the second state law examination.

== Personal life ==
Lederer lives with his husband in Prenzlauer Berg. He is a member of the Queer Nations initiative and participated in the Equality Parade in Warsaw as part of the Queer Nations conference in 2007. He performed several times with the Prenzlauer Berg-based a cappella group Rostkehlchen and released a CD in 2002, covering songs of the former East German punk band Feeling B in the style of a 1920s tenor.

On 5 June 2009, Lederer entered into a civil partnership with his long-term partner. They have been married since August 2018.

== Political career ==
Lederer joined the Party of Democratic Socialism (PDS) in 1992. From 1992 to 1995, he was a member of the youth welfare committee of the Mitte borough of Berlin. In 1995, he was elected to the municipal council in Prenzlauer Berg for the PDS. From 1997 to 2003, he was a member of the PDS federal arbitration committee. In 2000, he became deputy chairman of the PDS in Pankow; in 2003 he was elected deputy state chairman.

Lederer entered the Abgeordnetenhaus of Berlin on 1 January 2003 after the resignation of Harald Wolf. He became the PDS spokesman for legal policy and a member of the Committee for Constitutional and Legal Affairs, Immunity, and Rules of Procedure.

In December 2005, Lederer succeeded Stefan Liebich as state chairman of the Berlin branch of the PDS, which by this time had been renamed Left Party.PDS. At the state party conference, he received nearly 90% of the votes. After the foundation of The Left in June 2007, he was elected Berlin state chairman with 80% of the votes. Lederer ran as a candidate in Berlin-Mitte for the 2009 and 2013 federal elections but was unsuccessful, placing fourth both times.

Within The Left, Lederer is a member of the reform-oriented Forum for Democratic Socialism. He became a member of the party's federal executive board in 2012, serving until 2018.

Lederer was re-elected to the Abgeordnetenhaus in the 2006 and 2011 state elections. He was The Left's lead candidate in the 2016 election and was re-elected; The Left became the third largest party in the Abgeordnetenhaus. Lederer subsequently led the Left's negotiations with the SPD and Greens to form a coalition government, which were successful. After joining the Senate of Berlin, he resigned from the Abgeordnetenhaus in January 2017. He served as the lead candidate for The Left for a second time in the 2021 state election and was re-elected once again.

On 23 October 2024, Lederer resigned from his party, alongside Elke Breitenbach, Carsten Schatz, Sebastian Schlüsselburg, and Sebastian Scheel, following a party controversy regarding antisemitism during the war in Israel and Gaza.

=== Senator of Berlin ===
On 8 December 2016, Lederer became Deputy Governing Mayor and Senator for Culture and Europe in the second Müller senate. After the 2021 election, he was re-appointed to the same positions in the Giffey senate.

== Literature ==
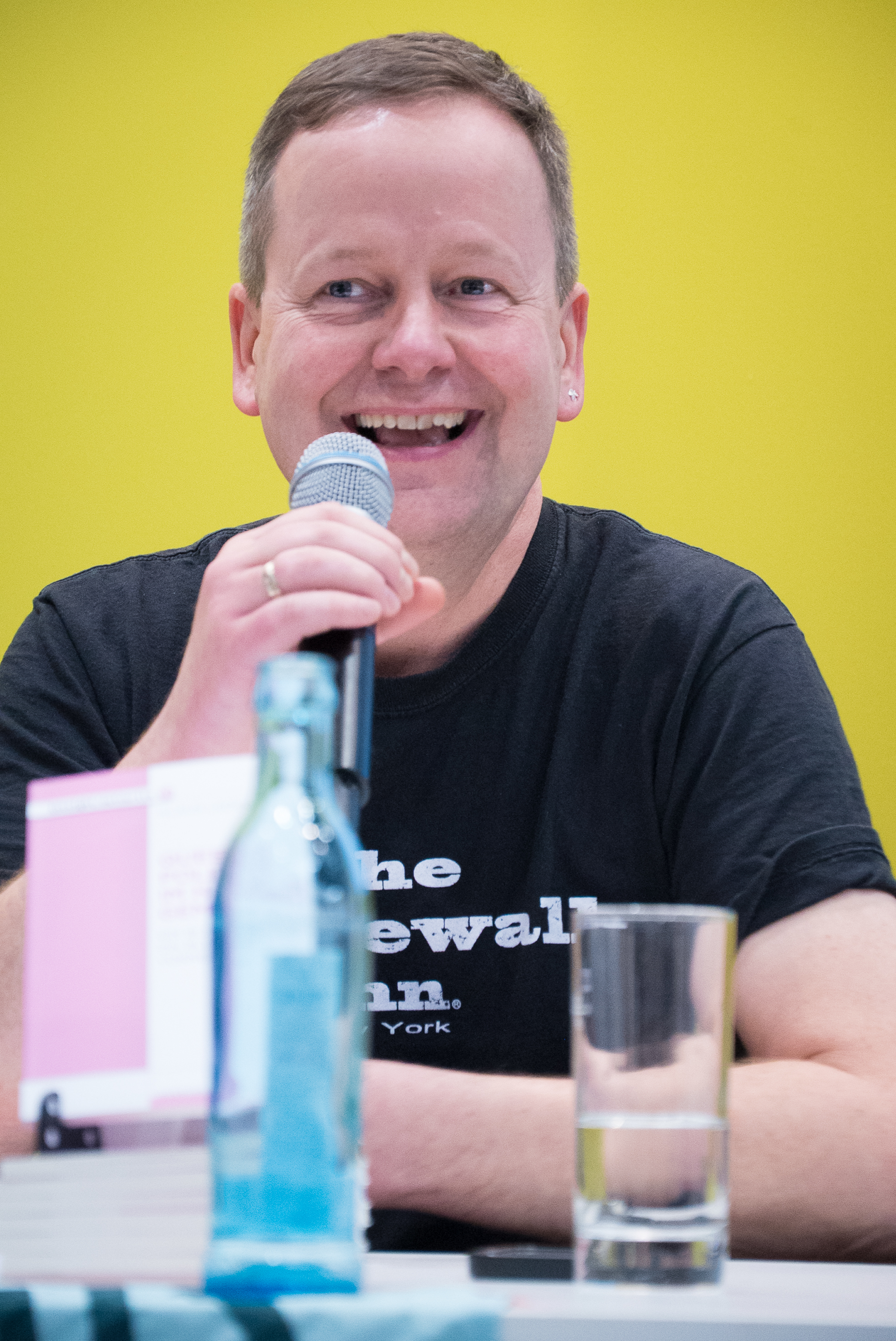
Klaus Lederer at the Leipzig Book Fair (2026)

- Mit links die Welt retten. Für einen radikalen Humanismus [Saving the World with the Left. For a Radical Humanism]. Kanon Verlag, Berlin 2024, ISBN 978-3-98568-110-5.
- with Karsten Krampitz, ed. (2013). Schritt für Schritt ins Paradies. Handbuch zur Freiheit [Step by Step into Paradise. Handbook on Freedom]. Berlin: Karin Kramer Verlag. ISBN 978-3-87956-374-6.
- with Hans Luft: Muss denn alles privatisiert werden? [Does Everything Have to be Privatized?] (= Pankower Vorträge 039). Helle Panke, Berlin 2001.
