= Werner Graf =

German politician (born 1980)

Werner Graf MdA
- Graf in 2021

Leader of Alliance 90/The Greens in the Abgeordnetenhaus of Berlin
- Incumbent
- Assumed office 15 March 2022 Serving with Bettina Jarasch
- Preceded by: Antje Kapek

Leader of Alliance 90/The Greens in Berlin
- In office 3 December 2016 – 12 December 2021 Serving with Nina Stahr
- Preceded by: Daniel Wesener
- Succeeded by: Philmon Ghirmai

Member of the Abgeordnetenhaus of Berlin
- Incumbent
- Assumed office 4 November 2021
- Constituency: Alliance 90/The Greens List

Personal details
- Born: 1980 (age 45–46) Neumarkt in der Oberpfalz, Germany
- Party: Alliance 90/The Greens

Werner Sebastian Graf (born 1980) is a German politician serving as a member of the Abgeordnetenhaus of Berlin since 2021. He has served as co-group leader of Alliance 90/The Greens since 2022.

== Personal life ==
Graf comes from Franconia in Bavaria. He founded the Hanf Journal ("Hemp Journal") and was editor-in-chief 2001 to 2005. From 2000 to 2002 he was the federal spokesperson for the Green Youth. He studied political science at the Bremen University of Applied Sciences from 2006 to 2010.

From 2016, he served for five years as co-chairman of the Berlin Green Party. In 2021, he was elected to the Berlin House of Representatives for the first time. In 2022, he became head of the Green Party parliamentary group. Since March 2023, he has been running this with Bettina Jarasch.

Graf and Jarasch were nominated as top candidates for the House of Representatives election on September 20, 2026.

Graf is openly gay.
