= Regine Günther =

German politician

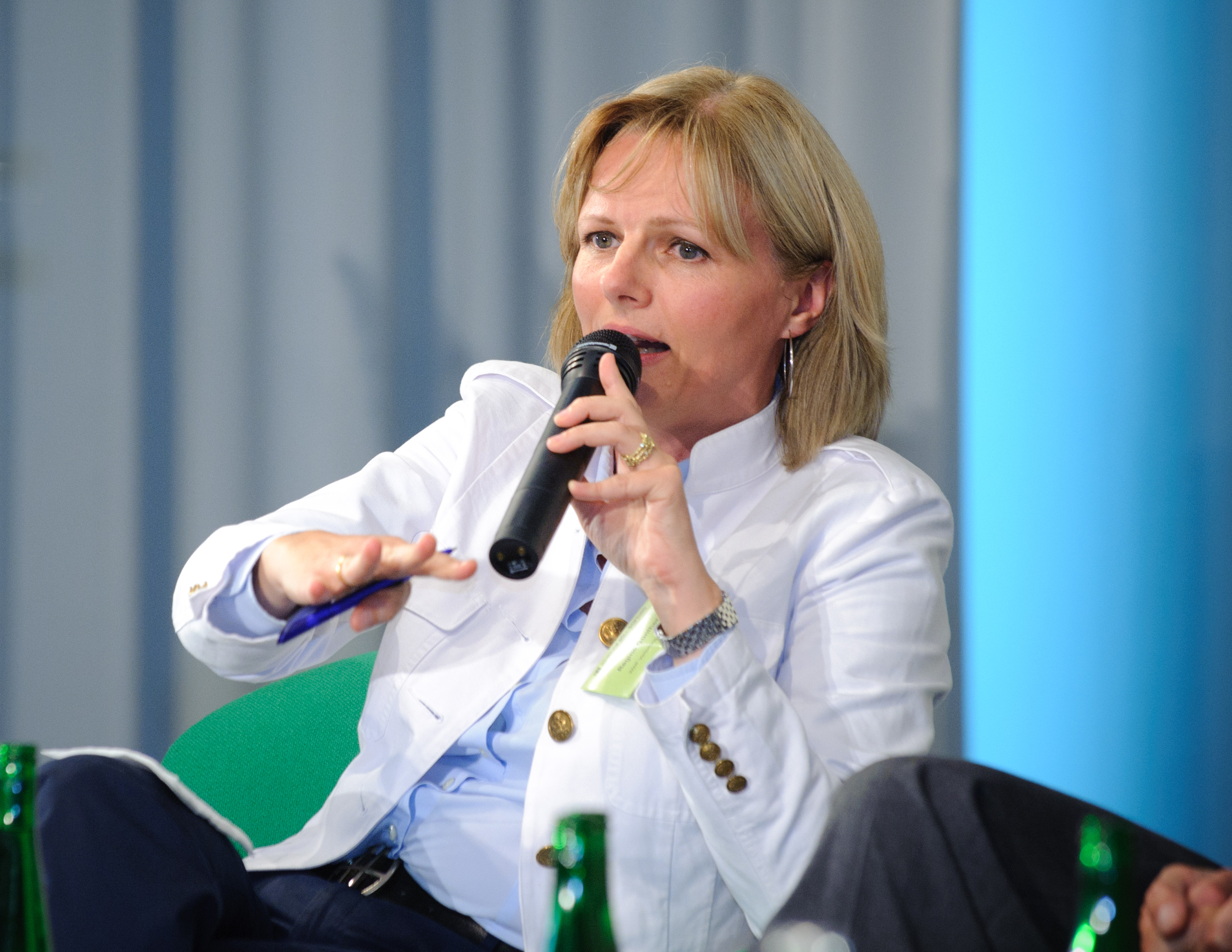
Regine Günther (2010)

Regine Günther (December 26, 1962, in Kaiserslautern) is a German politician (Alliance 90/The Greens). From December 8, 2016, to December 21, 2021, Günther served as Senator for Environment, Transport, and Climate Protection in the Berlin Senate. Prior to this role, she directed the Climate Protection and Energy department at WWF Germany for 16 years. Later, she held the position of Director General for Policy and Climate at the organization and served as Interim Climate and Energy Practice Leader at WWF International.

== Early life and career ==
Günther completed her high school education (Abitur) in 1982 and studied Political science as well as Modern and Contemporary History in Heidelberg. She completed a semester abroad in Madrid and then obtained her degree in Political Science (Diplom-Politologin) from the Free University of Berlin in 1990. From 1995 to 1998, she worked at the Berlin Energy Agency, and since 1999, she has been working for WWF Germany. Günther is recognized as an expert in national and international climate protection policy. In June 2019, she joined the party Alliance 90/The Greens (Bündnis 90/Die Grünen).

Günther has been living in Berlin since 1986. She is married and has an adult daughter.

From 2016 to 2021, Günther served as Senator for the Environment, Transport, and Climate Protection in the Berlin senate. As part of her role as a senator, Günther was a member of the supervisory board of the Berlin public transport company BVG and the municipal energy network operator 'Berlin Energie.' Following the Berlin state election in 2021, she announced at the end of October 2021 that due to family reasons, she would no longer be available for the position. With the inauguration of the Giffey senate on December 21, 2021, she stepped down from her position.

Regine Günther set the goal during her tenure to initiate the mobility transition in Berlin. The focal points of transportation policy from 2016 included reducing greenhouse gas emissions, achieving a fair distribution of space in favor of cycling, pedestrian traffic, and public transportation, enhancing traffic safety, and improving local air quality. To accomplish this, numerous laws, initiatives, and programs were developed, including the passage of Germany's first Mobility Act. The long-term development of a mobility transition was also enshrined in fundamental planning documents such as the Public Transport Plan, Urban Development Plan for Mobility and Traffic, and the Cycling Plan. Investments in expanding Berlin's public transport and cycling infrastructure were significantly increased.

== Publications ==
Vogel, Bernhard (Minister-President), ed. (June 8, 2007). "Klima im Wandel". Kein Klimaschutz ohne Märkte: Zur Effizienz des Emissionshandels (PDF). Die Politische Meinung. Konrad-Adenauer-Stiftung. pp. 23–26.
