= Ramona Pop =

German politician

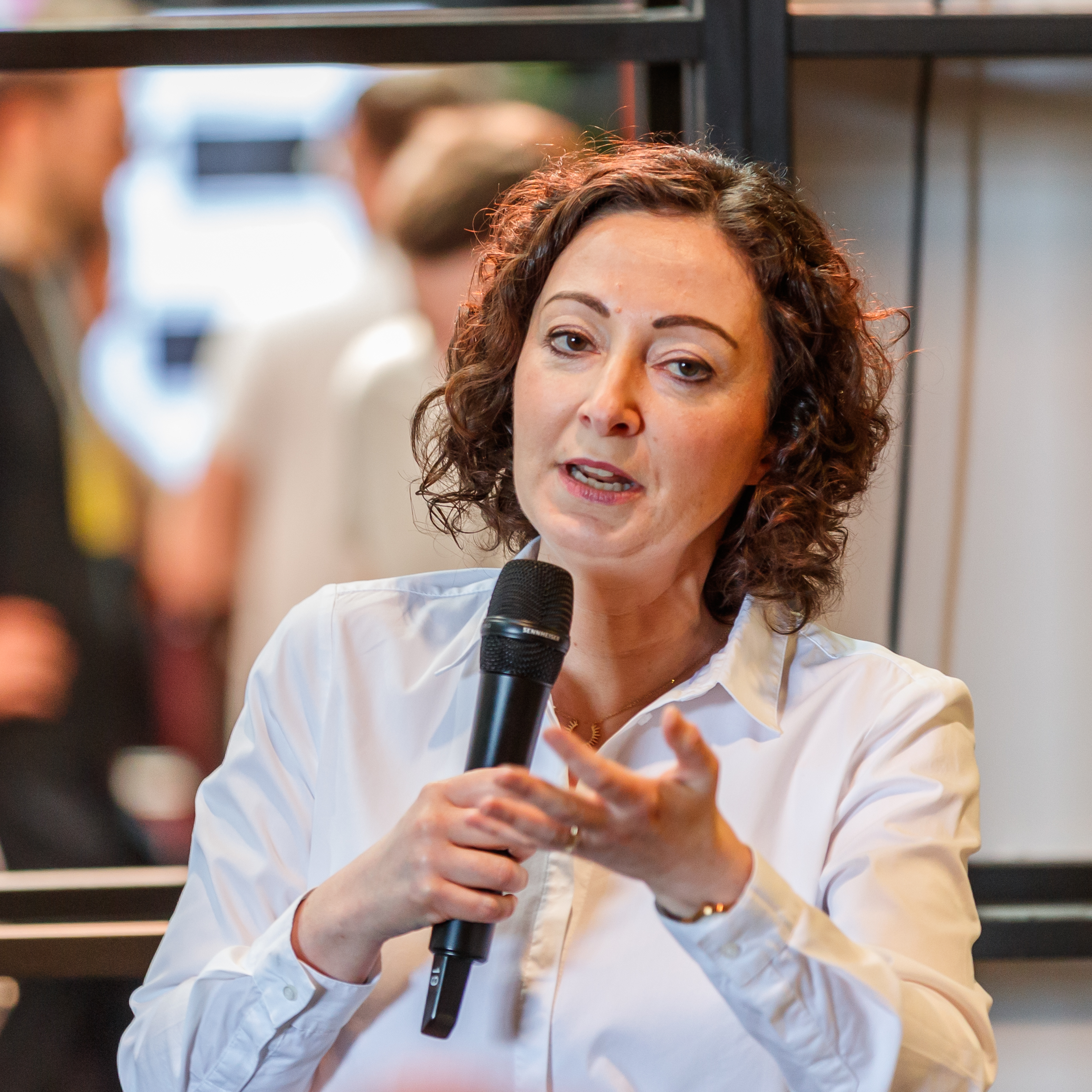
- Pop in 2023

Deputy Governing Mayor of Berlin
- In office 8 December 2016 – 20 December 2021 Serving with Klaus Lederer
- Governing Mayor: Michael Müller
- Preceded by: Dilek Kalayci
- Succeeded by: Bettina Jarasch

Senator for Economics, Energy and Business of Berlin
- In office 8 December 2016 – 20 December 2021
- Governing Mayor: Michael Müller
- Preceded by: Cornelia Yzer
- Succeeded by: Stephan Schwarz

Member of the Abgeordnetenhaus of Berlin
- In office 21 October 2011 – 4 November 2021
- Constituency: Mitte 1 (2011–21); List (2001–11)

Personal details
- Born: 31 October 1977 (age 48) Timișoara, Romania
- Party: Alliance 90/The Greens
- Education: Free University of Berlin

Ramona Pop (born 31 October 1977) is a Romanian-born German politician of the Alliance '90/The Greens party who has been serving as chairwoman of the Federation of German Consumer Organisations (VZBV) since 2022. She previously served as a deputy mayor of Berlin and Senator for Economy, Energy, and Enterprises (Senatorin für Wirtschaft, Energie und Betriebe) from 2016 until 2021.

== Early life and education ==
Pop was born in Timișoara, and grew up in Romania until her family, of Romanian and Romanian German origins, moved to Germany in 1988. In 1997 she completed high school. Pop studied political science in Münster and later at the Free University Berlin, graduating from its Otto-Suhr-Institut.

== Political career ==
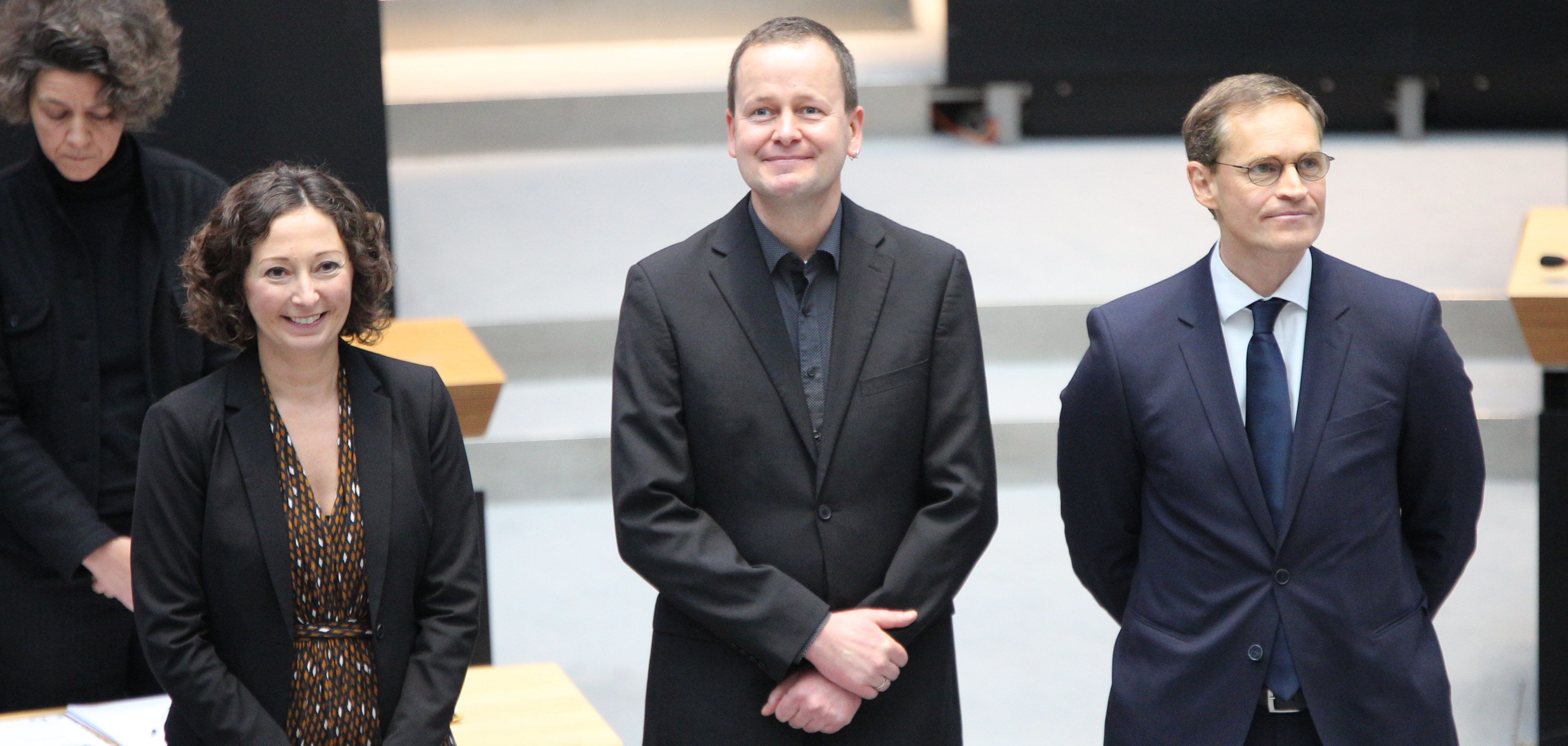
Left to right: Ramona Pop, Klaus Lederer, and Michael Müller at the Abgeordnetenhaus of Berlin plenary session on 8 December 2016

Pop has been a member of the Green party since 1997. In the 2001 state elections, she was elected into the Abgeordnetenhaus of Berlin. In parliament, she first served as the Green Party’s parliamentary group on youth policies. From 2009, she led the parliamentary group alongside Volker Ratzmann. Pop succeeded Renate Künast as leading candidate after Künast had made mistakes in the election campaign for 2011 Berlin state elections.

As one of her state's representatives at the Bundesrat, Pop served on the Committee on Economic Affairs.

Pop was a Green Party delegate to the Federal Convention for the purpose of electing the President of Germany in 2017.

== Other activities ==
=== Regulatory agencies ===
- Federal Network Agency for Electricity, Gas, Telecommunications, Post and Railway (BNetzA), Member of the Advisory Board

=== Corporate boards ===
- Berliner Stadtreinigung (BSR), Ex-Officio Chairwoman of the Supervisory Board (2017–2021)
- Berliner Verkehrsbetriebe (BVG), Ex-Officio Chairwoman of the Supervisory Board (2017–2021)
- Berliner Wasserbetriebe (BWB), Ex-Officio Chairwoman of the Supervisory Board (2017–2021)
- Investitionsbank Berlin (IBB), Ex-Officio Member of the Supervisory Board (2017–2021)
- Messe Berlin, Member of the Supervisory Board
- Deutsche Klassenlotterie Berlin (DKLB), Member of the Supervisory Board

=== Non-profit organizations ===
- Berlin School of Economics and Law (HWR), Member of the Board of Trustees (since 2017)
- Transparency International Germany, Member of the Advisory Board
