= Heroes Wear Red =

South African rock band

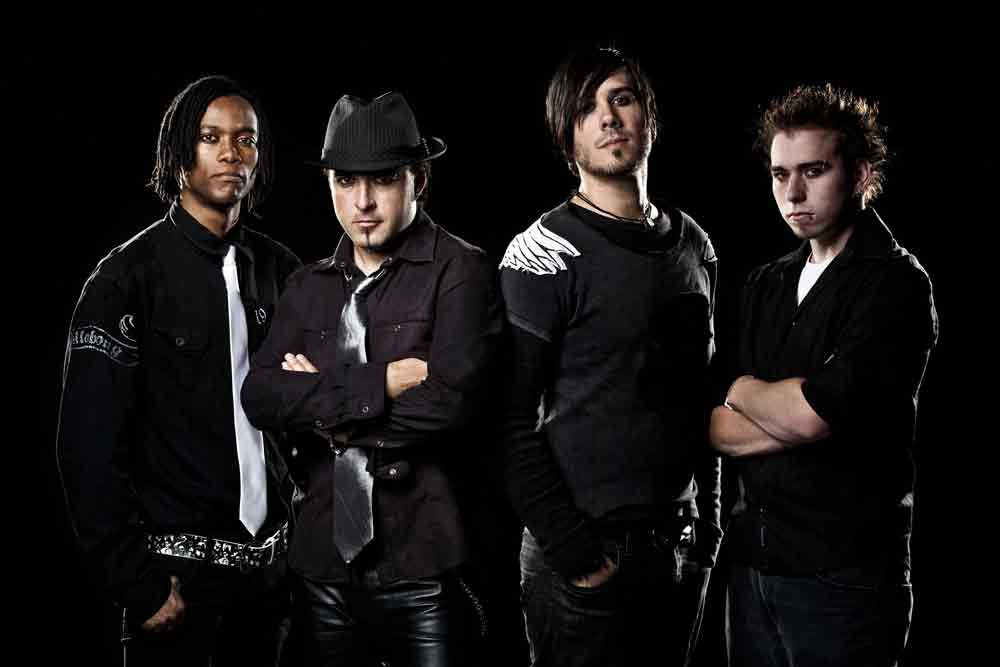

Background information
- Also known as: Bloodmoney (2006–2007)
- Origin: Johannesburg, Gauteng, South Africa
- Genres: Rock, Pop, Electronica
- Years active: 2006–present
- Labels: Musketeer Records, independent
- Members: Tim Kroon, Gavin Wienand, Tumi Mothei, Rob Storm
- Past members: Lorne McGregor, Garth McLeod
- Website: Heroes Wear Red on Facebook

Heroes Wear Red (HWR) is a rock band formed in Johannesburg, South Africa in 2006. The band, which was founded by bass player Gavin Wienand and vocalist Tim Kroon, is currently signed to Musketeer Records. Originally named Bloodmoney, the band changed their name in 2007, coinciding with the release of their debut album Surviving September. In 2008, Heroes Wear Red independently released Surviving September, which was co-produced by Rae DiLeo, who has worked with such artists as Filter, Veruca Salt, Henry Rollins, and Grand Master Flash. The band's first hit single, Beautiful Way, received favourable reviews from many social media outlets throughout South Africa, including maintaining the number one position on 5FM's Vodafone Hi5@5, for the seven consecutive weeks following that song's release.

== Band members ==
Current Members

- Tim Kroon - vocals (2006–present)
- Gavin Wienand - bass (2006–present)
- Tumi Mothei - guitar
- Rob Storm - drums (2008–present)

Former Members

- Lorne McGregor
- Garth McLeod

== Discography ==
Studio albums

- Bloodmoney EP (2006)
- Surviving September (2008)
- Harkener (2018)
