= Iris Spranger =

German politician

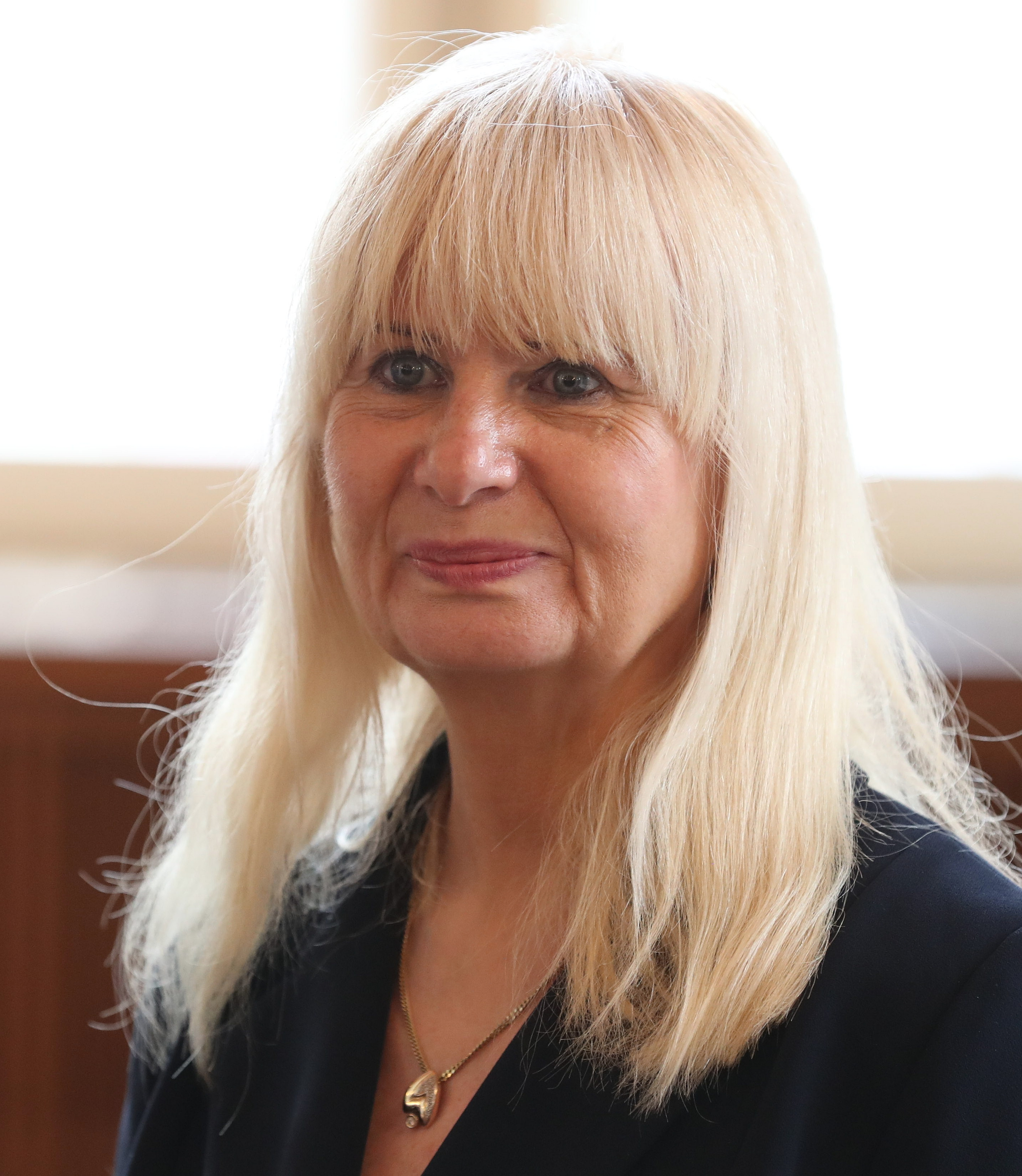
- Spranger in 2021

Senator for Interior, Digitalisation and Sport of Berlin
- Incumbent
- Assumed office 21 December 2021
- Governing Mayor: Franziska Giffey; Kai Wegner
- Preceded by: Andreas Geisel

Personal details
- Born: 19 September 1961 (age 65) Halle (Saale), East Germany
- Party: Social Democratic Party
- Education: Humboldt University of Berlin

Iris Spranger (born 19 September 1961) is a German politician of the Social Democratic Party (SPD) who has served as Senator for Interior, Digitalisation and Sport in the Berlin state government since December 2021. She has been a member of the Abgeordnetenhaus of Berlin since 2011, and previously served from 1999 to 2006. From 2006 to 2011 she was State Secretary in the state Finance Department.

== Personal life ==
Spranger studied law at the Humboldt University of Berlin from 1986 to 1991. From 1993 she worked as an accountant and one year later founded a financial accounting company. From 1994 to 2006, she was a freelance lecturer for tax law and commercial software at the Potsdam Chamber of Trades. Spranger is married and has one son.

== Political career ==
Spranger joined the SPD in 1994. She was elected to the executive board of the Berlin SPD in 2002, and became deputy chairwoman in 2004. She was elected to the Abgeordnetenhaus in the 1999 Berlin state election, where she was deputy chair of the SPD faction. She resigned in 2006 to become State Secretary in the Finance Department of the Senate of Berlin.

She returned to the Abgeordnetenhaus in the 2011 Berlin state election where she was elected on the SPD list; she also ran in the constituency of Marzahn-Hellersdorf 5, but lost to Mario Czaja of the CDU. In the new Abgeordnetenhaus, she became SPD spokeswoman for construction policy. In the 2013 German federal election, Spranger was the SPD candidate for the Bundestag constituency of Berlin-Marzahn-Hellersdorf, and placed third. In 2018, she became chairwoman of the SPD association in Marzahn-Hellersdorf.

On 21 December 2021, Spranger was appointed Senator for Interior, Digitalisation and Sports in the Giffey senate. She became the first female Interior Senator of Berlin. After taking office, she announced plans to recruit 700 additional police officers and firefighters for the city, as well as one hundred new employees to work on digitalisation. She also spoke of refurbishing fire brigades and prioritising public safety for women and girls.

== Social engagement ==
Spranger is deputy state chairwoman of the Berlin Workers' Welfare Association and a member of the organisation's federal presidium. She is also a member of the board of the Federal Association of Voluntary Welfare Workers and chairwoman of the Friends of the Victor Klemperer College.
