= Giffey senate =

State government of Berlin

Senate of Franziska Giffey Senate Giffey
- 28th Senate of Berlin
- 2021–2023
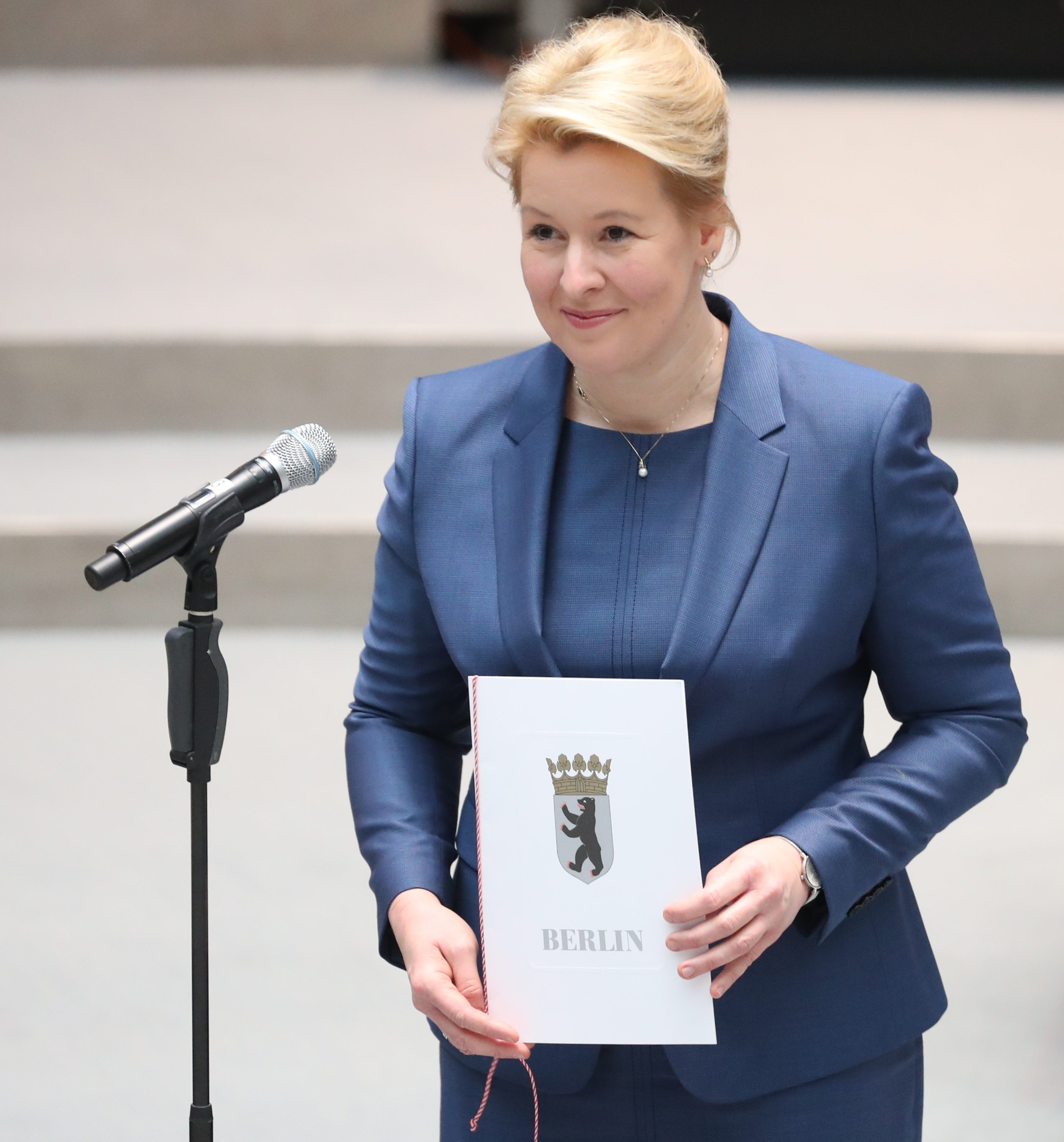
- Franziska Giffey at the Abgeordnetenhaus of Berlin plenary session on 21 December 2021
- Date formed: 21 December 2021
- Date dissolved: 26 April 2023

People and organisations
- Governing Mayor: Franziska Giffey
- Deputy Mayor: Bettina Jarasch; Klaus Lederer
- No. of ministers: 10
- Member parties: Social Democratic Party; Alliance 90/The Greens; The Left
- Status in legislature: Coalition government (Majority)
- Opposition parties: Christian Democratic Union; Alternative for Germany; Free Democratic Party

History
- Election: 2021 Berlin state election
- Legislature term: 19th Abgeordnetenhaus of Berlin
- Predecessor: Second Müller senate
- Successor: Wegner senate

The Giffey senate was the state government of Berlin between 2021 and 2023, sworn in on 21 December 2021 after Franziska Giffey was elected as Governing Mayor of Berlin by the members of the Abgeordnetenhaus of Berlin. It was the 28th Senate of Berlin.

It was formed after the 2021 Berlin state election by the Social Democratic Party (SPD), Alliance 90/The Greens (GRÜNE), and The Left (LINKE). Excluding the Governing Mayor, the senate comprised ten ministers, called Senators. Three were members of the SPD, three were members of the Greens, three were members of the Left, and one was an independent politician (nominated by the SPD).

The Giffey senate was succeeded by the Wegner senate on 27 April 2023.

== Formation ==
The previous Senate was a coalition government of the SPD, Left, and Greens led by Governing Mayor Michael Müller of the SPD. He announced that he would not seek another term in the 2021 state election, and federal minister Franziska Giffey was chosen as the SPD's lead candidate.

The election took place on 26 September 2021, and resulted in no net change for the SPD, while the Greens improved from fourth to second place and the Left saw a minor decline. The SPD and Greens voiced their mutual desire to form a government together, and began to seek a third partner to reach a majority. Giffey favoured a coalition with the Free Democratic Party, while the Greens wanted to renew the outgoing government with The Left.

On 14 October, Giffey announced that the SPD and Greens would seek negotiations with The Left. After several weeks of discussions, the three parties presented their coalition agreement on 28 November. It was approved at an SPD congress on 5 December with 91.5% approval, followed by a Greens congress on 12 December where it was passed with 96.4% approval. The Left held a membership ballot to approve the coalition. The results were announced on 17 December, with 74.9% voting in favour.

The Abgeordnetenhaus elected Giffey as Governing Mayor on 21 December. She won 84 votes out of 139 cast, with 52 against, two abstentions, one invalid vote, and eight deputies absent.

== Composition ==
Portfolio	Senator	Party	Took office	Left office	State secretaries
Governing Mayor of Berlin; Senate Chancellery	Franziska Giffey born 3 May 1978	SPD	21 December 2021	26 April 2023	Severin Fischer (Head of the Senate Chancellery); Ana-Maria Trăsnea (Civic Engagement and Int'l Affairs, Representative to the Federal Government)
Deputy Mayor Senator for Environment, Mobility, Consumer and Climate Protection	Bettina Jarasch born 22 November 1968	GRÜNE	21 December 2021	26 April 2023	Silke Karcher (Environment and Climate Protection); Meike Niedbal (Mobility); Markus Kamrad (Consumer Protection, Head of Office)
Deputy Mayor Senator for Culture and Europe	Klaus Lederer born 21 March 1974	LINKE	21 December 2021	26 April 2023	Torsten Wöhlert (Culture); Gerry Woop (Europe)
Senator for Education, Youth and Family	Astrid-Sabine Busse born 23 October 1957	SPD	21 December 2021	26 April 2023	Alexander Slotty (Education); Aziz Bozkurt (School Digitalisation, Youth and Family)
Senator for Finance	Daniel Wesener born 5 December 1975	GRÜNE	21 December 2021	26 April 2023	Barbro Dreher; Jana Borkamp
Senator for Interior, Digitalisation and Sport	Iris Spranger born 19 September 1961	SPD	21 December 2021	26 April 2023	Torsten Akmann (Interior); Nicola Böcker-Giannini (Sport); Ralf Kleindiek (Chief digital officer)
Senator for Integration, Labour and Social Affairs	Katja Kipping born 18 January 1978	LINKE	21 December 2021	26 April 2023	Wenke Christoph (Integration and Social Affairs); Alexander Fischer (Labour)
Senator for Justice, Diversity and Anti-Discrimination	Lena Kreck born 23 January 1981	LINKE	21 December 2021	26 April 2023	Daniela Brückner (Justice); Saraya Gomis (Diversity and Anti-Discrimination)
Senator for Urban Development, Construction and Housing	Andreas Geisel born 1 March 1966	SPD	21 December 2021	26 April 2023	Christian Gaebler (Construction and Housing); Ülker Radziwill (Tenant Protection); Petra Kahlfeldt (Senate Construction Director)
Senator for Economy, Energy and Enterprise	Stephan Schwarz born 15 May 1965	Ind. (SPD nomination)	21 December 2021	26 April 2023	Michael Biel (Economy); Tino Schopf (Energy and Enterprise)
Senator for Science, Health, Nursing and Equality	Ulrike Gote born 26 October 1965	GRÜNE	21 December 2021	26 April 2023	Thomas Götz (Health and Nursing); Armaghan Naghipour (Science, Research and Equality)
