= Treptow-Köpenick 1 =

State electoral district of Germany

- Electoral district for the Berlin House of Representatives
- Treptow-Köpenick 1 in 2023
- District: Treptow-Köpenick
- Electorate: 28,840 (2026)

Current electoral district
- Party: The Left
- Member: Moritz Warnke

Treptow-Köpenick 1 is an electoral constituency (German: Wahlkreis) represented in the House of Representatives of Berlin. It elects one member via first-past-the-post voting.

== Geography ==
Until 2026, the constituency comprised the areas of Alt-Treptow, Plänterwald, Baumschulenweg, northern Niederschöneweide, and western Oberschöneweide. It is entirely within the borough of Treptow-Köpenick.

There were 28,840 eligible voters in 2026.

== Members ==
Election	Member	Party	%
1995	Jutta Matuschek	PDS	33.0
1999	Jutta Matuschek	PDS	37.5
2001	Jutta Matuschek	PDS	41.2
2006	Andy Jauch	SPD	35.1
2011	Andy Jauch	SPD	33.3
2016	Karalin Gennburg	The Left	26.4
2021	Karalin Gennburg	The Left	26.2
2023	Karalin Gennburg	The Left	25.9
2026	Moritz Warnke	The Left	40.7

== Election results ==
=== 2026 election ===
State election (2026): Treptow-Köpenick 1
Notes:	Blue background denotes the winner of the electorate vote. Pink background denotes a candidate elected from their party list. Yellow background denotes an electorate win by a list member, or other incumbent. A ✓ or ✗ denotes status of any incumbent, win or lose respectively.						
Party	Candidate	Votes	%	±%	Party votes	%	±%
Left	Moritz Warnke	8,762	40.7	▲13.5	8,535	39.3	▲17.5
Greens	Catrin Wahlen	3,260	15.1	▼4.8	3,251	15.0	▼7.5
AfD	Noah Häbel	3,111	14.4	▲5.8	3,168	14.6	▲5.9
SPD	Alexander Freier-Winterwerb	2,342	10.9	▼6.7	2,148	9.9	▼5.2
CDU	Dustin Hoffmann	2,097	9.7	▼6.7	2,049	9.4	▼6.5
BSW	Simone Ebertus	933	4.3		965	4.4	
Tierschutzpartei	Carolin Pleier	530	2.5	▼0.7	439	2.0	▼0.6
Volt	Pia Voltz	509	2.4		399	1.8	▲0.9
FDP					317	1.5	▼1.3
PARTEI					254	1.2	▼1.1
PdF					78	0.4	
DKP					45	0.2	▼0.1
ÖDP					40	0.2	▼0.1
du.					19	0.1	▼0.3
HEIMAT					16	0.1	▼0.2
SGP					13	0.1	▼0.2
Informal votes		437			245		
Total valid votes		21,544			21,736		
Turnout		21,981	76.2	▲11.3			
Left hold	Majority	5,502	25.6	▲19.0			

=== 2023 repeat election ===
Changes denoted below for the 2023 election are compared to the 2016 election, as the 2021 election was declared invalid.

State election (2023): Treptow-Köpenick 1
Notes:	Blue background denotes the winner of the electorate vote. Pink background denotes a candidate elected from their party list. Yellow background denotes an electorate win by a list member, or other incumbent. A ✓ or ✗ denotes status of any incumbent, win or lose respectively.						
Party	Candidate	Votes	%	±%	Party votes	%	±%
Left	✓ Katalin Gennburg	5,670	25.9	▼0.4	4,580	20.9	▼4.7
Greens	Catrin Wahlen	4,215	19.3	▲3.8	4,672	21.3	▲5.7
CDU	Dustin Hoffmann	4,120	18.8	▲8.8	4,013	18.3	▲8.6
SPD	Alexander Freier-Winterwerb	3,492	16.0	▼7.4	3,452	15.8	▼3.8
AfD	Andrea Lorenz	2,142	9.8	▼5.6	2,137	9.8	▼5.1
Tierschutzpartei	Carolin Pleier	725	3.3		599	2.7	▲0.6
FDP	Vincent Westphal	593	2.7	▲0.2	678	3.1	▲0.1
PARTEI	Dewitt Hnida	539	2.5	▼1.5	486	2.2	▼1.0
Volt					194	0.9	
FW	Robert Soyka	170	0.8		73	0.3	
dieBasis	Stephan Haube	143	0.7		118	0.5	
Klimaliste					102	0.5	
Team Todenhöfer					89	0.4	
The Grays					88	0.4	
Gray Panthers					82	0.4	▼0.6
Pirates					81	0.4	▼2.3
Verjüngungsforschung					71	0.3	▼0.2
du.					60	0.3	
Mieterpartei					56	0.3	
Humanists					51	0.2	
DKP					40	0.2	▼0.2
Bildet Berlin!					34	0.2	
ÖDP	Steffen Kadow	56	0.3		32	0.1	
NPD					30	0.1	▼0.6
Bergpartei, die ÜberPartei					29	0.1	
LKR	Christian Seiffert	16	0.1		12	0.1	▼0.3
The Pinks/Alliance 21					12	0.1	
BüSo					10	0.0	▼0.1
SGP					9	0.0	▼0.1
Informal votes		199			176		
Total valid votes		22,181			22,890		
Turnout		22,103	62.6	▼4.5			
Left hold	Majority	1,455	6.6				

=== 2021 election (annulled) ===
The election in 2021 was annulled and rerun in 2023.

State election (2021): Treptow-Köpenick 1
Notes:	Blue background denotes the winner of the electorate vote. Pink background denotes a candidate elected from their party list. Yellow background denotes an electorate win by a list member, or other incumbent. A ✓ or ✗ denotes status of any incumbent, win or lose respectively.						
Party	Candidate	Votes	%	±%	Party votes	%	±%
Left	✓ Katalin Gennburg	7,005	26.2	▼0.1	6,205	23.1	▼2.5
SPD	Alexander Freier-Winterwerb	5,339	20.0	▼3.4	5,019	18.7	▼0.9
Greens	Catrin Wahlen	5,326	19.9	▲4.5	5,537	20.6	▲5.0
CDU	Dustin Hoffmann	2,796	10.5	▲0.4	2,636	9.8	▲0.1
AfD	Andrea Lorenz	2,291	8.6	▼6.8	2,285	8.5	▼6.3
FDP	Vincent Westphal	1,191	4.5	▲1.9	1,278	4.8	▲1.8
Tierschutzpartei	Carolin Pleier	1,041	3.9		739	2.8	▲0.6
PARTEI	Dewitt Hnida	834	3.1	▼0.8	758	2.8	▼0.4
dieBasis	Stephan Haube	439	1.6		369	1.4	
FW	Robert Soyka	338	1.3		254	0.9	
Volt					252	0.9	
Klimaliste					223	0.8	
Team Todenhöfer					174	0.6	
The Grays					171	0.6	
APT					131	0.5	
Gray Panthers					124	0.5	▼0.5
Pirates					118	0.4	▼2.2
Verjüngungsforschung					82	0.3	▼0.2
Humanists					79	0.3	
du.					69	0.3	
Mieterpartei					69	0.3	
ÖDP	Steffen Kadow	93	0.3		56	0.2	
DKP					50	0.2	▼0.2
NPD					48	0.2	▼0.5
Bildet Berlin!					45	0.2	
Bergpartei, die ÜberPartei					39	0.1	
LKR	Christian Seiffert	35	0.1		27	0.1	▼0.3
The Pinks/Alliance 21					15	0.1	
SGP					10	0.0	▼0.1
BüSo					4	0.0	▼0.1
Informal votes		340			286		
Total valid votes		26,728			26,866		
Turnout		27,211	76.2	▲9.1			
Left hold	Majority	1,666	6.2				

== See also ==
- Politics of Berlin
- House of Representatives of Berlin
