= Franziska Giffey =

German politician (born 1978)

Franziska Giffey MdA MdBR
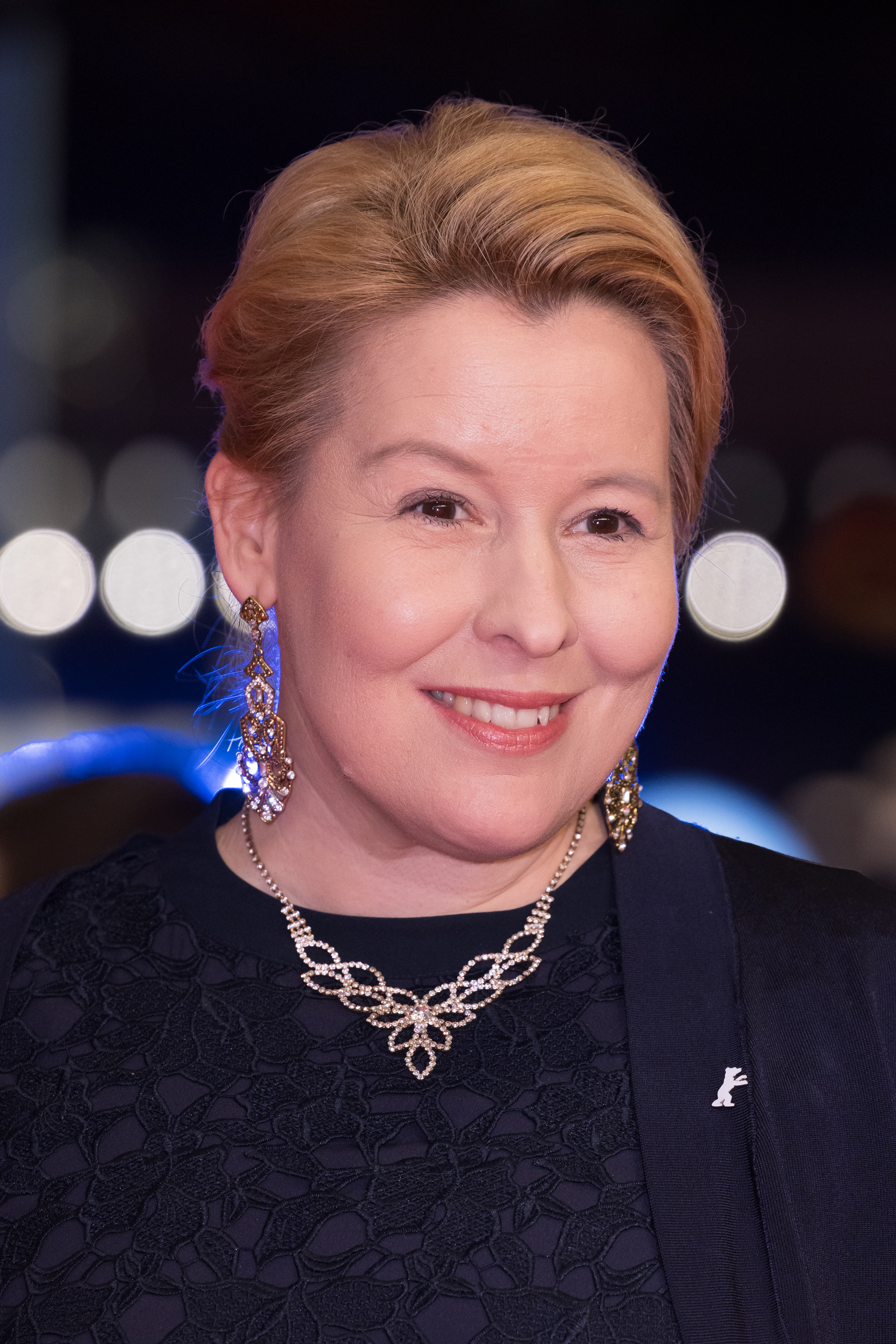
- Giffey in 2024

Deputy Governing Mayor of Berlin
- Incumbent
- Assumed office 27 April 2023 Serving with Stefan Evers
- Governing Mayor: Kai Wegner
- Preceded by: Bettina Jarasch

Senator for Economy, Energy and Enterprise of Berlin
- Incumbent
- Assumed office 27 April 2023
- Governing Mayor: Kai Wegner
- Preceded by: Stephan Schwarz

Governing Mayor of Berlin
- In office 21 December 2021 – 27 April 2023
- Deputy: Bettina Jarasch; Klaus Lederer
- Preceded by: Michael Müller
- Succeeded by: Kai Wegner

Leader of the Social Democratic Party in Berlin
- In office 28 November 2020 – May 2024 Serving with Raed Saleh
- Deputy: Ina Czyborra; Andreas Geisel; Iris Spranger; Julian Zado
- Preceded by: Michael Müller
- Succeeded by: Nicola Böcker-Giannini; Martin Hikel

Minister of Family Affairs, Senior Citizens, Women and Youth
- In office 14 March 2018 – 20 May 2021
- Chancellor: Angela Merkel
- Preceded by: Katarina Barley
- Succeeded by: Christine Lambrecht

Mayor of Neukölln
- In office 15 April 2015 – 14 March 2018
- Preceded by: Heinz Buschkowsky
- Succeeded by: Martin Hikel

Member of the Berlin House of Representatives
- In office 4 November 2021 – 20 September 2026
- Preceded by: Karin Korte

Personal details
- Born: Franziska Süllke; 3 May 1978 (age 48) Frankfurt (Oder), Bezirk Frankfurt, East Germany (now in Brandenburg, Germany)
- Party: Social Democratic Party (2007–)
- Spouse: Karsten Giffey (m. 2008)
- Children: 1
- Education: Humboldt University of Berlin (no degree); Free University of Berlin (no degree); Berlin School of Economics and Law
- Occupation: Politician; Docent; Civil Servant
- Website: Official website

Franziska Giffey (German: [fʁanˈtsɪska ˈɡɪfaɪ̯], née Süllke, born 3 May 1978) is a German politician of the Social Democratic Party (SPD) who is serving as Berlin State Senator for Economy, Energy and Enterprise since 2023. She served as Governing Mayor of Berlin from December 2021 to April 2023. As of 2025, she is the youngest living (sitting or former) head of a German state government. She previously served as Minister for Family Affairs, Senior Citizens, Women and Youth in the government of Chancellor Angela Merkel from 2018 until 2021. From 2015 to 2018, she was the mayor of the borough of Neukölln in Berlin.

== Early life and education ==
Born in Frankfurt (Oder), Giffey grew up in Briesen. After her Abitur in 1997, she started studying English and French at Humboldt University of Berlin in order to become a teacher, but had to leave the profession in 1998 for medical reasons. She subsequently studied administrative law at the Fachhochschule für Verwaltung und Rechtspflege (merged later to the Berlin School of Economics and Law) in Berlin from 1998 until 2001. During her graduate studies in European administrative management from 2003 to 2005, she worked at the Representation of Berlin to the European Union in Brussels in 2003 and at the Parliamentary Assembly of the Council of Europe in Strasbourg in 2005. In 2005, she started extra-occupational doctoral studies at the Free University of Berlin, where she received her doctorate in 2010. Her thesis dealt with the inclusion of civil society by the European Commission in EU decision-making. However, on 10 June 2021, her doctorate was annulled for plagiarism by the presidium of the Free University of Berlin.

In addition to her studies, she worked as Commissioner for European Affairs in the district administration of Neukölln from 2002 to 2010.

== Political career ==
Giffey joined the Social Democratic Party (SPD) in 2007. Before becoming district mayor, Giffey had already served from 2010 as Neukölln’s district councillor for education, school, culture, and sports, where she gained first political experience.

In 2015, she succeeded Heinz Buschkowsky as mayor of the Berlin district of Neukölln, a borough characterized by a large immigrant population and high unemployment. During her time in office, Giffey earned a reputation as a hands-on and approachable local politician, while also being noted for her “law and order” stance in dealing with issues such as youth violence, integration, and public safety.

=== Federal Minister of Family Affairs, 2018–2021 ===
After the formation of a grand coalition between the CDU under Chancellor Angela Merkel and the SPD in the wake of the 2017 federal election, Giffey was appointed member of the fourth Merkel cabinet in March 2018, serving as Federal Minister of Family Affairs, Senior Citizens, Women and Youth. She succeeded Katarina Barley in this office, who became Federal Minister of Justice and Consumer Protection.

Following the 2018 Chemnitz protests, Giffey was the first member of Merkel's cabinet to visit the site where a 35-year-old German carpenter was stabbed to death.

In mid-2020, Giffey presented the government's first equality strategy, which bundled together measures that aim to get more women into leadership roles, narrow the gender pay gap, and improve work-life balance. By early 2021, she introduced legislation introducing stricter gender equality rules for government-controlled companies and measures to force larger listed companies to have at least one woman on their management boards.

=== Allegations of plagiarism and resignation ===
In 2019, allegations of plagiarism prompted the Free University of Berlin to review Giffey’s 2010 dissertation. The university initially concluded that while her thesis contained deficiencies, they were not severe enough to revoke her doctorate. Instead, Giffey received a formal reprimand, and she was allowed to retain her title. Nevertheless, she announced that she would resign if her doctorate was ever revoked and withdrew from the race for her party’s leadership due to the ongoing scrutiny.

As criticism of the university’s handling of the case persisted, the Free University decided to reopen the review. On 10 June 2021, its presidium unanimously stripped Giffey of her doctorate, citing 69 instances of either missing or improper attribution across the 200-page thesis and determining she had engaged in “at least partially intentional deception“. By that time, Giffey had already announced in 2020 that she would voluntarily cease using her doctoral title, pending the outcome of the proceedings.

She resigned as federal minister on 19 May 2021 but immediately secured the SPD’s candidacy for Berlin mayor, a position she held until the end of her term in April 2023.

=== Mayor of Berlin, 2021–2023 ===
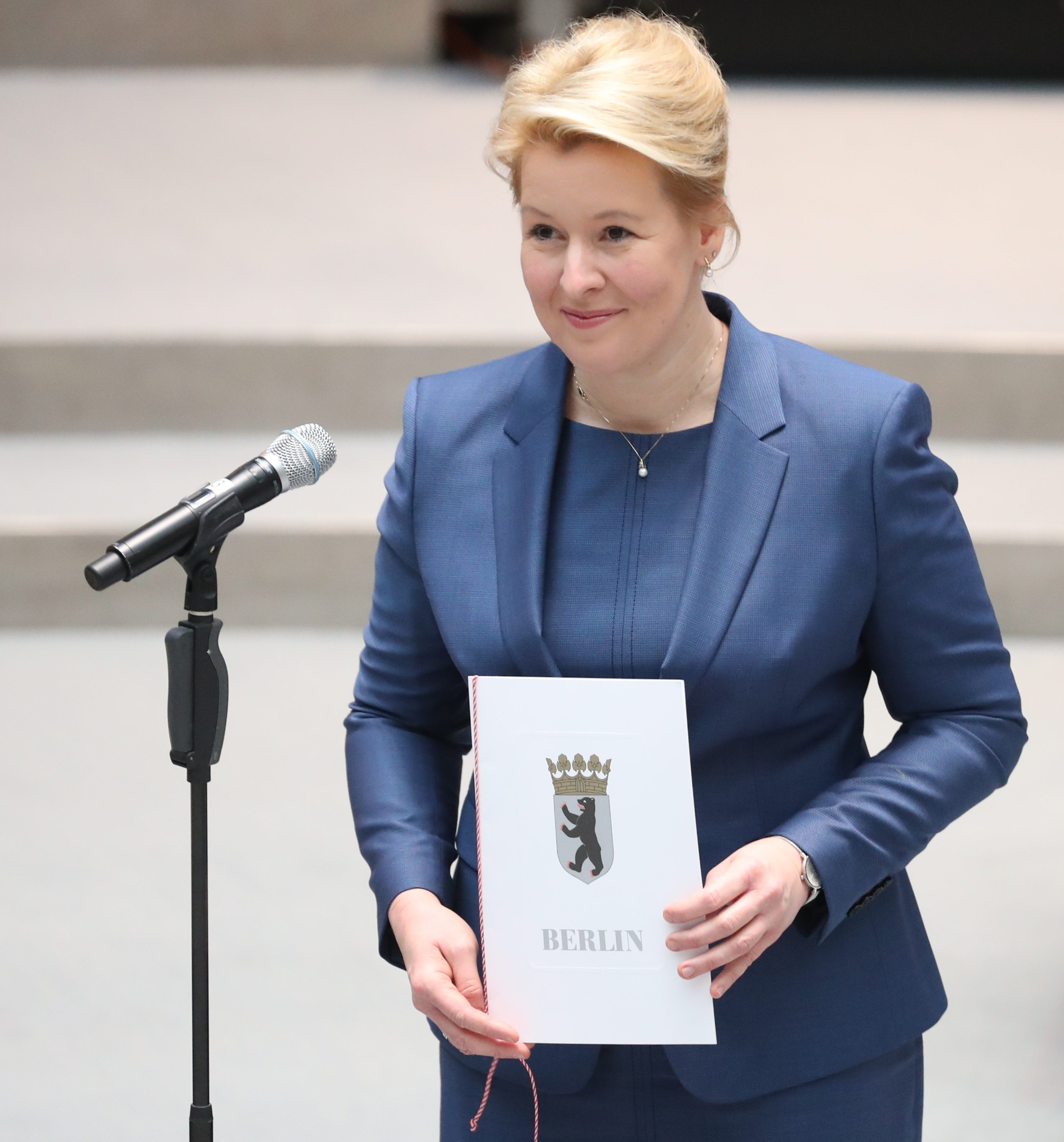
Giffey as elected Mayor of Berlin (December 2021)

When Berlin's governing mayor Michael Müller announced his intention not to run again for his party's leadership in the state, Giffey and Raed Saleh expressed their intention to take over as dual leaders.

On 26 September 2021, the SPD, which Giffey served as the Mayoral candidate for in Berlin, would retain most seats in the Berlin House of Representatives following the 2021 Berlin state election. On 28 November 2021, a coalition agreement between the SPD, the Green Party and the Left Party in Berlin was finalized, though the proposed government program still awaited approval from individual party committees before Giffey could take office. On 5 December 2021, 91.5 percent of Berlin's SPD delegates approved the coalition agreement.

On 21 December 2021, Giffey was sworn in as Governing Mayor of Berlin after 84 Berlin House deputies voted in favor of her, while 52 voted against her and two abstained. Immediately afterwards, the Giffey senate was appointed and sworn in, allowing the new government to commence its work.

Giffey was nominated by her party as delegate to the Federal Convention for the purpose of electing the President of Germany in 2022.

=== Deputy Mayor of Berlin, 2023–present ===
After the repeat election to the Berlin House of Representatives in February 2023, the SPD under Franziska Giffey suffered significant losses and, for the first time in decades, was overtaken by the CDU. Although the SPD ended up behind the CDU, Giffey faced a strategic choice: she could have continued her previous coalition with the Greens and The Left, which together held a majority of 10 seats (down from 12) and would have allowed her to remain as Governing Mayor.

Instead, Giffey opted for a different course. Intra-party debates ensued, but she ultimately decided to lead the SPD into a coalition as junior partner with the election winner, the CDU. This move handed the office of Governing Mayor to Kai Wegner, while Giffey herself became his deputy and assumed the post of Senator for Economics, Energy and Enterprises. The decision was controversial within her party, as many SPD members would have preferred to maintain the traditional red-green-red coalition. Giffey, however, justified the step with the argument of ensuring political stability and a fresh start for Berlin’s governance.

With her election as Governing Mayor of Berlin in 2021, Giffey had already become the youngest head of government in Germany’s history. Even after the coalition shift in 2023, she retained a central role in the city’s political leadership, now shaping Berlin’s economic and energy policies as part of the grand coalition with the CDU.

Against the backdrop of a series of assaults on German politicians, Giffey was attacked during an event on 7 May 2024 at a Berlin library, sustaining injuries to her head and neck. A 74-year-old man was detained in connection with the attack. Reacting to the attacks, she expressed shock at how people engaged in politics had increasingly become targets for violence and called for societal resistance against such attacks.

== Political positions ==
In November 2026, Giffey publicly endorsed Hubertus Heil's candidacy as the SPD's co-leader.

== Personal life ==
Giffey has been married to a veterinarian since 2008; the couple has one son. Her nephew is basketball player Niels Giffey.
