= Berlin School of Economics and Law =

Higher education institution

Coordinates: 52°29′07″N 13°20′16″E

- Hochschule für Wirtschaft und Recht Berlin
- Other name: BSEL
- Type: Public
- Established: 1971; 55 years ago
- Affiliations: AMBA Accreditation, FIBAA Accreditation, ACQUIN, AQAS, NIBS, EFMD, AACSB
- President: Andreas Zaby
- Students: 10.472
- Location: Badensche Straße 52, 10825 Berlin, Berlin, Germany
- Campus: Urban
- Colors: Black White Red
- Website: www.hwr-berlin.de

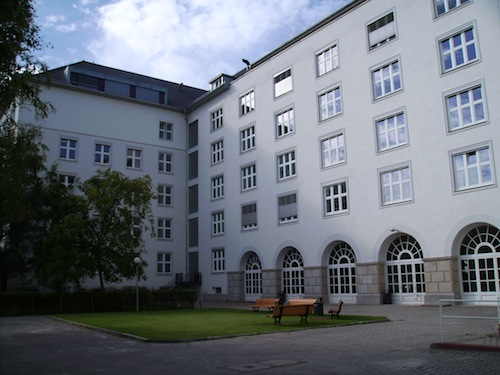
Schöneberg campus

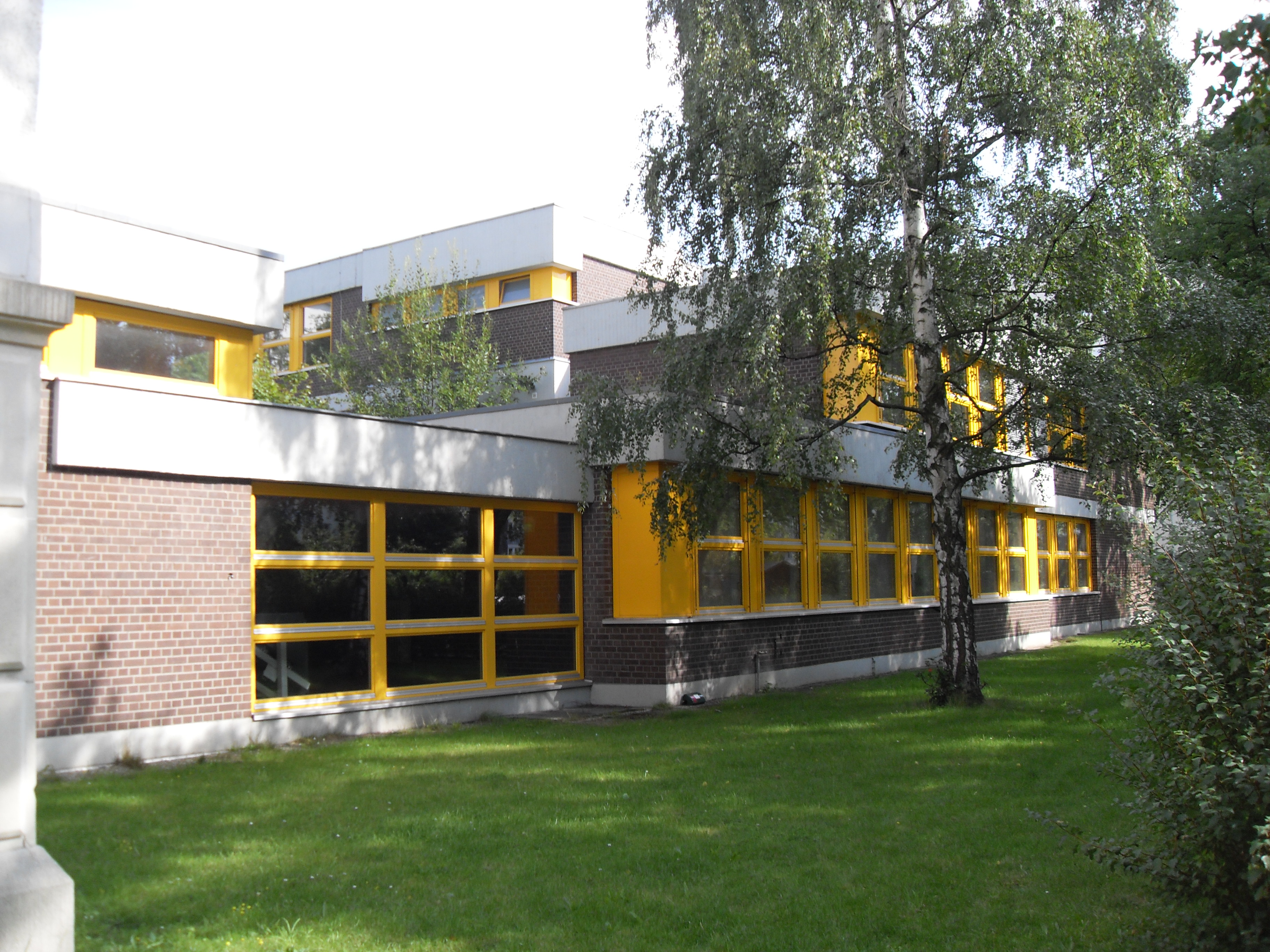
BPS Berlin Professional School

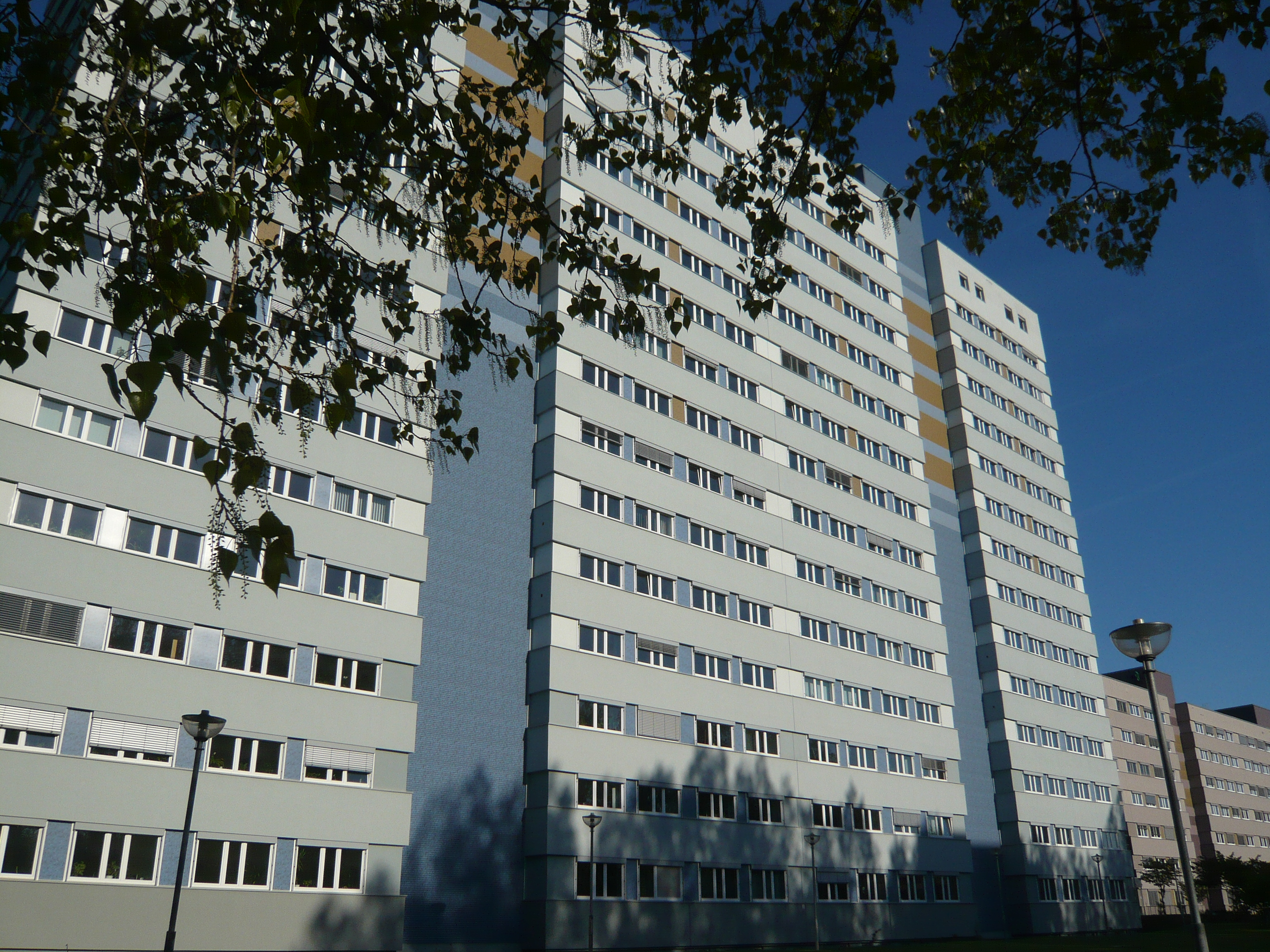
Friedrichsfelde campus

The Berlin School of Economics and Law (German: Hochschule für Wirtschaft und Recht), abbreviated as BSEL, is a public institution of higher education and research founded on 1 April 2009 through the merger of the Berlin School of Economics (BSE) and the FHVR Berlin. The BSEL portfolio provides a wide range of Bachelor's, Master's and doctoral programmes in fields such as business, administration for the public and private sector, public security, law, or engineering. BSEL has an international approach with close working relationships to over 150 partner universities all over the world.

The school offers a 5-year dual degree with France's ESCE International Business School in Paris, enabling selected bilingual students to have the "Master in Management" from ESCE and the Master of Arts from HWR Berlin. This program is supported by the Franco-German University (FGU).

According to Times Higher Education, BSEL is considered one of the top 15 MBA schools (rank 6) in Germany . At the same time, in WirtschaftsWoche's ranking of Germany's major applied science universities, BSEL ranked 5th in Business & Information Systems Engineering (2015) , and 12th in Computer Science in the country (2018).

== Accreditations ==
BSEL is AMBA accredited (one of 6 schools in Germany) and member of the EFMD, the AACSB as well as the UAS7 Alliance for Excellence, a strategic alliance of seven leading German universities.

== Campus locations ==
The Berlin School of Economics and Law (BSEL) has two campuses. The main campus is located in Berlin-Schöneberg and is home to the University administration, the Faculty of Business and Economics and the BPS Berlin Professional School. The campus with the Faculty of Company-Linked Programmes, Faculty of Administration and Law, Faculty of Law, Faculty of Police Training and Management and the Institute for Distance Learning is part of the educational complex in Berlin-Lichtenberg.

== International affairs ==
The Berlin School of Economics and Law encourages the internationalization of its students through its more than 150 partner universities throughout the world, e.g. in Italy, Australia, the Netherlands, Great Britain, France, India, Canada, Mexico, China, Japan, the United States and Hong Kong.

== Faculties and central institutes ==
=== Department of Business and Economics ===
The Department of Business and Economics (Department 1) offers eight Bachelor programmes which usually combine a focus on business and economics with a wider integrative and interdisciplinary perspective. The inclusion of gender studies and environmental and sustainability issues are also important features of some of the programmes. Whilst all programmes have certain international components three of the programmes are entirely international either in the form of a bi-national dual degree course or by being taught in English and by including compulsory study abroad periods. The Master-of-Arts programmes of the faculty are run in English or in English and French.

=== Department of Cooperative Studies ===
The Department of Cooperative Studies (Department 2) offers a total of 16 sector-oriented bachelor programmes with business and technical specializations and two Master programmes. The unique feature of these programmes is the combination of theory-based teaching phases and on the job-training phases. The programmes are run in close co-operation with 700 partner companies which are also involved in programme development. After three years of studies, the students obtain their Bachelor‘s degree and are usually offered a position by their respective training company.

=== Department of Public Administration ===
The Department of Public Administration (Department 3) comprises the Berlin School of Public Administration and the Berlin School of Law. The faculty conducts research in fields such as public management, non-profit management, organization theory, public organizational behavior, public change management, and broad scope of administrative and legal issues from a European and internationally comparative perspective.

=== Department of Legal Studies ===
In the Department of Legal Studies (Department 4) prospective court officials and registrars study in an "internal" diploma programme for the wide range of legal tasks they will be entrusted with by the court and public prosecutors' offices in the Länder of Berlin, Brandenburg and Sachsen-Anhalt. The Department of Legal Studies also offers a Bachelor of Laws degree in Commercial Law. This programme combines special legal expertise (including real estate law, property and real estate law of enforcement, insolvency law, mercantile, corporate and registry law) with business subjects, especially those in business administration. In addition, the Department of Legal Studies teaches the main degree course for the higher levels of the foreign service and offers LL.M. in "Guardian and Custodian" as well as in "Real Estate Law and Law of Execution".

=== Department of Police and Security Management ===
The Department of Police and Security Management (Department 5) provides a range of Bachelors' and master's degree programmes which cover local, company and private sector security. This includes a police management degree programme, the graduation in which is the basic entry requirement for higher career levels in the Berlin Police Force. All the degree programmes have a practical and interdisciplinary focus, and cover topics from the Legal, Policing, Social and Economic Sciences.

=== BPS Berlin Professional School ===
The Berlin School of Economics was among the first business schools in Germany to offer MBA-programmes through its Berlin Professional School (formerly known as Institute of Management Berlin (IMB)) and can look back on 15 years of experience in this field. The BPS’s core competence is the MBA programme, and especially MBAs with different key themes. The five accredited MBA programmes of the BPS aim to prepare graduates – with various foci – for leading positions in general management of businesses or in the healthcare sector. The BPS offers also three M.A. programmes and one certificate programme. In 2013 the BPS Berlin Professional School has been granted accreditation for its MBA provision by the Association of MBAs (AMBA). The Berlin School of Economics is hence the fourth business school in Germany to have been accredited by the organization.

The BPS also concentrates the e-learning programmes of the BSEL. The institute offers part-time study programmes specializing in administrative and security management. The institute's portfolio includes three courses of study leading to a master's degree: a Master of European Administrative Management, a Master of Public Administration, and a Master of Security Management. In addition, the institute offers a BA programme in Public Administration. The Institute now also offers Master of Science (M.Sc.) in International Business Management.

=== Institute for Co-operation with Central and Eastern European Countries in Public Reform (IMO) ===
The Institute for Co-operation with Central and Eastern European Countries in Public Reform (IMO) is an interdisciplinary center of competence for development and consultancy projects in the areas of modernizing public administration and reforming police in the countries of Central and Eastern Europe. The tasks of the institute include Central and Eastern European research as well as the design, the organization and the implementation of international study curricula and further training courses in the context of the EU Lifelong Learning programme. Another important objective is the establishment and the support of scientific networks and mobility-enhancing co-operations.

== See also ==
- Education in Germany
- List of institutions accredited by AMBA
