= Fourth Wowereit senate =

State government of Berlin

Fourth Senate of Klaus Wowereit Senate Wowereit IV
- 25th Senate of Berlin
- 2011–2014
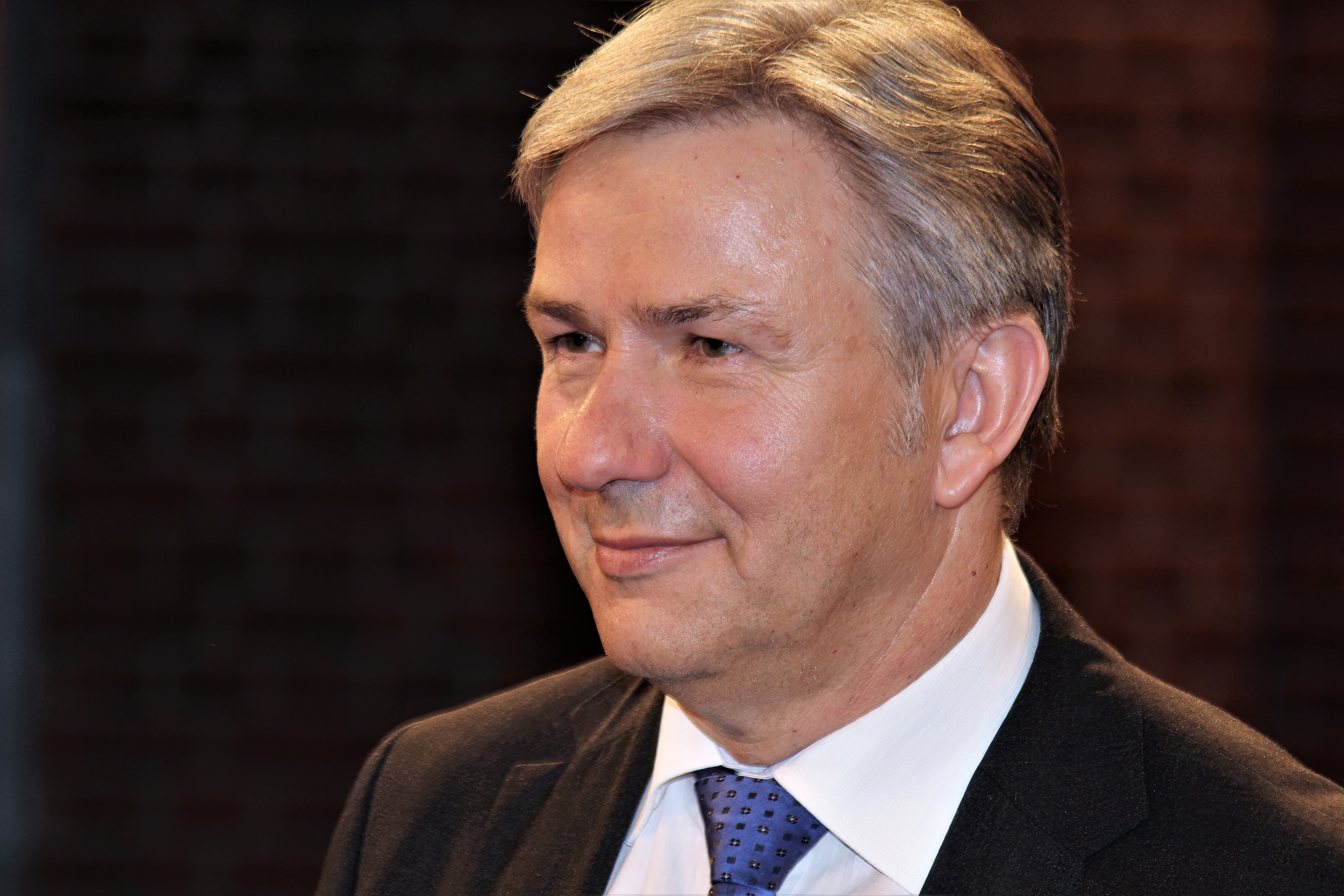
- Klaus Wowereit in February 2012
- Date formed: 24 November 2011
- Date dissolved: 10 December 2014

People and organisations
- Governing Mayor: Klaus Wowereit
- Deputy Mayor: Frank Henkel; Michael Müller
- No. of ministers: 8
- Member parties: Social Democratic Party; Christian Democratic Union
- Status in legislature: Grand coalition
- Opposition parties: Alliance 90/The Greens; The Left; Pirate Party

History
- Election: 2011 Berlin state election
- Legislature term: 17th Abgeordnetenhaus of Berlin
- Predecessor: Third Wowereit senate
- Successor: First Müller senate

The fourth Wowereit senate was the state government of Berlin between 2011 and 2014, sworn in on 24 November 2011 after Klaus Wowereit was elected as Governing Mayor by the members of the Abgeordnetenhaus of Berlin. It was the 25th Senate of Berlin.

It was formed after the 2011 Berlin state election by the Social Democratic Party (SPD) and Christian Democratic Union (CDU). Excluding the Governing Mayor, the senate comprised eight members, called Senators. Three were members of the SPD, four were members of the CDU, and one was an independent politician (nominated by the SPD).

After Wowereit's resignation as Governing Mayor, the fourth Wowereit senate was succeeded by the first Müller senate on 11 December 2014.

== Formation ==
The previous Senate was a coalition government of the SPD and The Left led by Governing Mayor Klaus Wowereit.

The election took place on 18 September 2011, and resulted in losses for both governing parties. The SPD remained in first place while The Left fell from third to fourth. The opposition CDU and Greens improved, and the Pirate Party debuted at 9%. As a result of their losses, the SPD and The Left fell short of a majority, bringing the coalition to an end.

The SPD initially began exploratory talks with the Greens; Wowereit later said that the Greens were their preferred coalition partner. However, the SPD withdrew from discussions on 5 October, citing irreconciliable disagreements over the proposed extension of the Bundesautobahn 100, which the SPD supported and the Greens opposed. They instead began negotiations with the CDU for a grand coalition. The parties presented their coalition pact on 16 November.

Wowereit was re-elected as Governing Mayor by the Abgeordnetenhaus on 24 November, winning 84 votes out of 148 cast. His Senate was sworn in on 1 December.

== Composition ==
The composition of the Senate at the time of its dissolution was as follows:

Portfolio	Senator	Party	Took office	Left office
Governing Mayor of Berlin; Senate Chancellery	Klaus Wowereit born 1 October 1953	SPD	24 November 2011	10 December 2014
Deputy Mayor Senator for Interior and Sport	Frank Henkel born 16 November 1963	CDU	1 December 2011	10 December 2014
Deputy Mayor Senator for Urban Development and Environment	Michael Müller born 9 December 1964	SPD	1 December 2011	10 December 2014
Senator for Economics, Technology and Research	Sybille von Obernitz born 11 March 1962	Ind. (CDU nomination)	1 December 2011	11 September 2012
Senator for Economics, Technology and Research	Cornelia Yzer born 28 July 1961	CDU	27 September 2012	10 December 2014
Senator for Education, Youth and Science	Sandra Scheeres born 15 February 1970	SPD	1 December 2011	10 December 2014
Senator for Finance	Ulrich Nußbaum born 10 April 1957	Ind. (SPD nomination)	1 December 2011	10 December 2014
Senator for Health and Social Affairs	Mario Czaja born 21 September 1975	CDU	1 December 2011	10 December 2014
Senator for Labour, Integration and Women	Dilek Kolat born 7 February 1967	SPD	1 December 2011	10 December 2014
Senator for Justice and Consumer Protection	Michael Braun born 21 January 1956	CDU	1 December 2011	12 December 2011
Senator for Justice and Consumer Protection	Thomas Heilmann born 16 July 1964	CDU	12 January 2012	10 December 2014
