= First Müller senate =

State government of Berlin

First Senate of Michael Müller Senate Müller I
- 26th Senate of Berlin
- 2014–2016
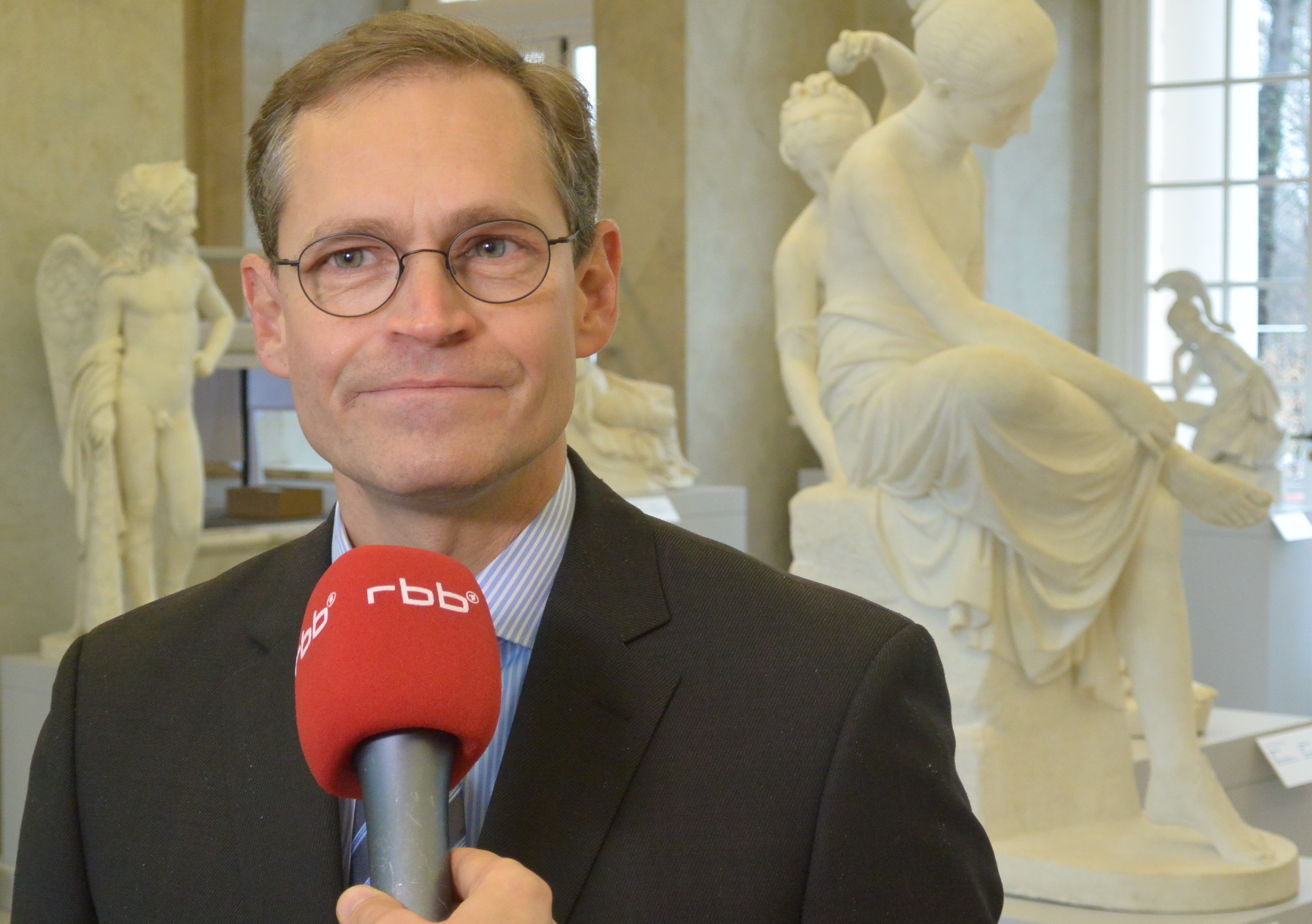
- Michael Müller at the Schloss Charlottenburg a week after his election as Governing Mayor
- Date formed: 11 December 2014
- Date dissolved: 7 December 2016

People and organisations
- Governing Mayor: Michael Müller
- Deputy Mayor: Frank Henkel; Dilek Kolat
- No. of ministers: 8
- Member parties: Social Democratic Party; Christian Democratic Union
- Status in legislature: Grand coalition
- Opposition parties: Alliance 90/The Greens; The Left; Pirate Party

History
- Election: None
- Legislature term: 17th Abgeordnetenhaus of Berlin
- Predecessor: Fourth Wowereit senate
- Successor: Second Müller senate

The first Müller senate was the state government of Berlin between 2014 and 2016, sworn in on 11 December 2014 after Michael Müller was elected as Governing Mayor by the members of the Abgeordnetenhaus of Berlin. It was the 26th Senate of Berlin.

It was formed after the resignation of Governing Mayor Klaus Wowereit, and was a continuation of the grand coalition of the Social Democratic Party (SPD) and Christian Democratic Union (CDU) formed after the 2011 Berlin state election. Excluding the Governing Mayor, the senate comprised eight members, called Senators. Four were members of the SPD and four were members of the CDU.

The first Müller senate was succeeded by the second Müller senate on 8 December 2016.

== Formation ==
The previous Senate was a grand coalition government of the SPD and CDU led by Governing Mayor Klaus Wowereit of the SPD. Wowereit announced his resignation in August 2014, citing continued delays in the opening of the Berlin Brandenburg Airport, which he described as his "biggest failure".

The SPD held a membership ballot to determine his successor; if no candidate received a majority in the initial ballot, a runoff would be held between the top two. Candidates standing for election were Senator for Urban Development Michael Müller, SPD parliamentary leader Raed Saleh, and former state SPD chairman Jan Stöß. The postal vote was held from 19 September to 18 October, with Müller receiving 59.1% of votes, followed by Stöß with 20.8% and Saleh with 18.6%. Approximately 11,000 of the party's 17,200 members voted, corresponding to 64% turnout.

Müller was elected as Governing Mayor by the Abgeordnetenhaus on 11 December, winning 87 votes out of 145 cast.

== Composition ==
The composition of the Senate at the time of its dissolution was as follows:

Portfolio	Senator	Party	Took office	Left office	State secretaries
Governing Mayor of Berlin; Senate Chancellery	Michael Müller born 9 December 1964	SPD	11 December 2014	8 December 2016	Björn Böhning; Hella Dunger-Löper; Tim Renner
Deputy Mayor Senator for Interior and Sport	Frank Henkel born 16 November 1963	CDU	11 December 2014	8 December 2016	Bernd Krömer; Andreas Statzkowski
Deputy Mayor Senator for Labour, Integration and Women	Dilek Kolat born 7 February 1967	SPD	11 December 2014	8 December 2016	Barbara Loth; Boris Velter
Senator for Urban Development and Environment	Andreas Geisel born 1 March 1966	SPD	11 December 2014	8 December 2016	Christian Gaebler; Regula Lüscher; Engelbert Lütke Daldrup
Senator for Education, Youth and Science	Sandra Scheeres born 15 February 1970	SPD	11 December 2014	8 December 2016	Mark Rackles; Sigrid Klebba; Steffen Krach
Senator for Finance	Matthias Kollatz-Ahnen born 24 September 1957	SPD	11 December 2014	8 December 2016	Margaretha Sudhof; Klaus Feiler
Senator for Health and Social Affairs	Mario Czaja born 21 September 1975	CDU	11 December 2014	8 December 2016	Emine Demirbüken-Wegner; Dirk Gerstle
Senator for Justice and Consumer Protection	Thomas Heilmann born 16 July 1964	CDU	11 December 2014	8 December 2016	Alexander Straßmeir; Sabine Toepfer-Kataw
Senator for Economics, Technology and Research	Cornelia Yzer born 28 July 1961	CDU	11 December 2014	8 December 2016	Henner Bunde; Hans Reckers
