= Mario Czaja =

German politician (born 1975)

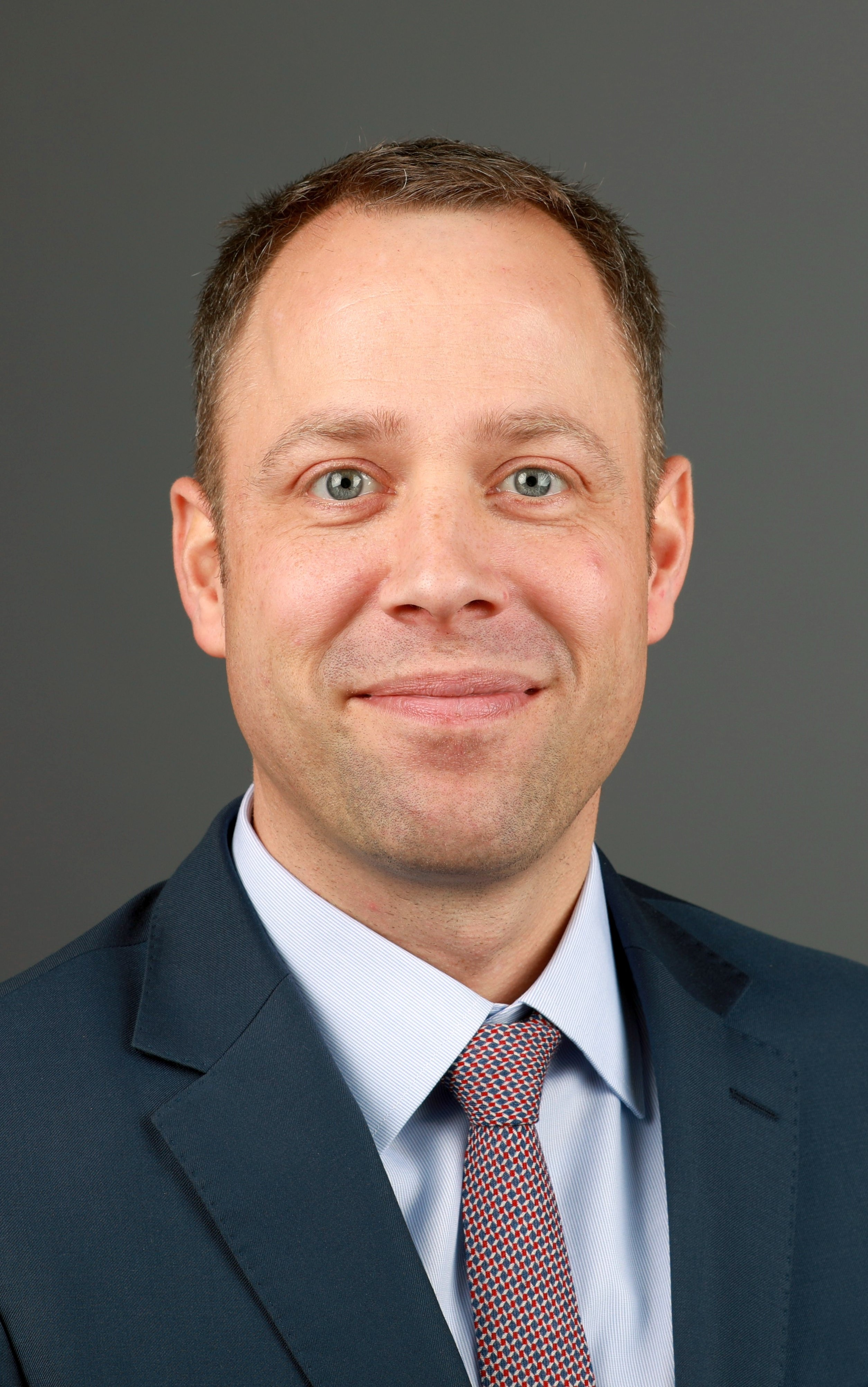
- Czaja in 2017

General Secretary of the Christian Democratic Union
- In office 31 January 2022 – 12 July 2023
- Deputy: Christina Stumpp
- Leader: Friedrich Merz
- Preceded by: Paul Ziemiak
- Succeeded by: Carsten Linnemann (acting)

Senator for Health, Care and Equality of Berlin
- In office 24 November 2011 – 8 December 2016
- Governing Mayor: Klaus Wowereit; Michael Müller
- Preceded by: Katrin Lompscher
- Succeeded by: Elke Breitenbach (Integration, Labour and Social Issues); Dilek Kalayci (Health, Nursing and Equality)

Senator for Justice and Consumer Protection of Berlin
- Interim
- In office 12 December 2011 – 12 January 2012
- Governing Mayor: Klaus Wowereit
- Preceded by: Michael Braun
- Succeeded by: Thomas Heilmann
Parliamentary constituencies
Member of the Bundestag; for Berlin-Marzahn-Hellersdorf
In office 26 October 2021 – 25 March 2025
Preceded by	Petra Pau
Succeeded by	Gottfried Curio
Member of the; Berlin House of Representatives
In office Constituency established – 4 November 2021
Preceded by	18 November 1999
Succeeded by	Katharina Günther-Wünsch
Constituency	Hellersdorf 1 (1999–2001); Marzahn-Hellersdorf (2001–2006); Marzahn-Hellersdorf 5 (2006–2021)

Personal details
- Born: 21 September 1975 (age 50) East Berlin, East Germany
- Party: Christian Democratic Union
- Children: 1
- Relatives: Sebastian Czaja (brother)
- Education: Technical University of Applied Sciences Wildau
- Website: mario-czaja.de

Mario Czaja (born 21 September 1975) is a German politician of the Christian Democratic Union (CDU) who has been serving as a member of the German Bundestag since the 2021 elections.

Czaja served as the party's Secretary General from 2022 to 2023, under the leadership of Friedrich Merz. From 2006 until 2021, he was a member of the State Parliament of Berlin.

== Early life and career ==
Czaja was born 1975 in East Berlin, the capital of East Germany, and studied business administration. From 1997 until 2000, he worked at insurance company Nürnberger Versicherung.

== Political career ==
=== Career in state politics ===
Czaja entered the CDU in 1993 and became member of the State Parliament of Berlin in the 1999 state elections. He served as his parliamentary group's spokesperson on health policy from 2001 until 2011.

From 2011 to 2016 Czaja was also member of the Senate of Berlin, the government body of Berlin, with responsibility for health care and social issues. At the time, he was the youngest member of the state government led by Governing Mayor Michael Müller.

In 2012, Czaja – together fellow state ministers Frank Henkel and Thomas Heilmann – unsuccessfully advocated for a reduction in the penalty-free personal use of cannabis from 15 to six grams. Also during his time in office, he appointed former state government members Eberhard Diepgen, Heidi Knake-Werner, Ingrid Stahmer and Wolfgang Wieland as advisors on the city's migration policies in 2014. In 2016, Czaja cancelled the government's contract with one of the city's largest operators of hostels for asylum seekers after newspapers B.Z. and Bild printed internal emails showing the company's managers joking about building a guillotine and crematorium for refugee children.

Czaja was a CDU delegate to the Federal Convention for the purpose of electing the President of Germany in 2017.

From 2018 until 2021, Czaja served as his parliamentary group's deputy chair, under the leadership of Burkard Dregger. During that time, he was also a member of the Committee on Education, Youth and Families.

=== Member of the German Parliament (2021–2025) ===
Czaja won the Berlin-Marzahn-Hellersdorf district in the 2021 German federal election – a seat held by members of the PDS or The Left since the 1990 German federal election (the first to be held in East Berlin).

Ahead of the Christian Democrats' leadership election in 2022, Czaja publicly endorsed Friedrich Merz to succeed Laschet as the party's chair and joined his campaign team.

== Other activities ==
=== Corporate boards ===
- Vivantes Hospital Group, Ex-Officio Member of the supervisory board (2011–2016)

=== Non-profit organizations ===
- German Red Cross (DRK) – Berlin Chapter, President
- German Heart Center, Ex-Officio Member of the council (2011–2016)

== Political positions ==
Within the CDU, Czaja is considered an ally of Jens Spahn. When the CDU/CSU entered into a coalition government with the center-left Social Democratic Party (SPD) on the national level following the 2013 elections, he joined a group of young party members – including Günter Krings, Michael Kretschmer and Spahn – in signing an open letter which called for changes in the CDU's policies and leadership. For the 2021 national elections, he joined Spahn in endorsing Armin Laschet as the Christian Democrats' joint candidate to succeed Chancellor Angela Merkel.

Also in 2021, Czaja publicly criticized the chairman of the CDU in Berlin, Kai Wegner, as being too right-wing, arguing that he was "closer to Hans-Georg Maaßen than Angela Merkel and Armin Laschet."

== Personal life ==
Czaja's brother is Sebastian Czaja. He has been married to Julia Marx since 2012. They have one daughter.

In 1997, a court ordered Czaja – who was 21 years old at the time – to pay a fine of 2,000 Deutsche Mark for desertion after he had twice failed to report for duty in the German Armed Forces. The prosecution had originally demanded a suspended sentence of four months.
