= Dilek Kalayci =

Turkish-German politician

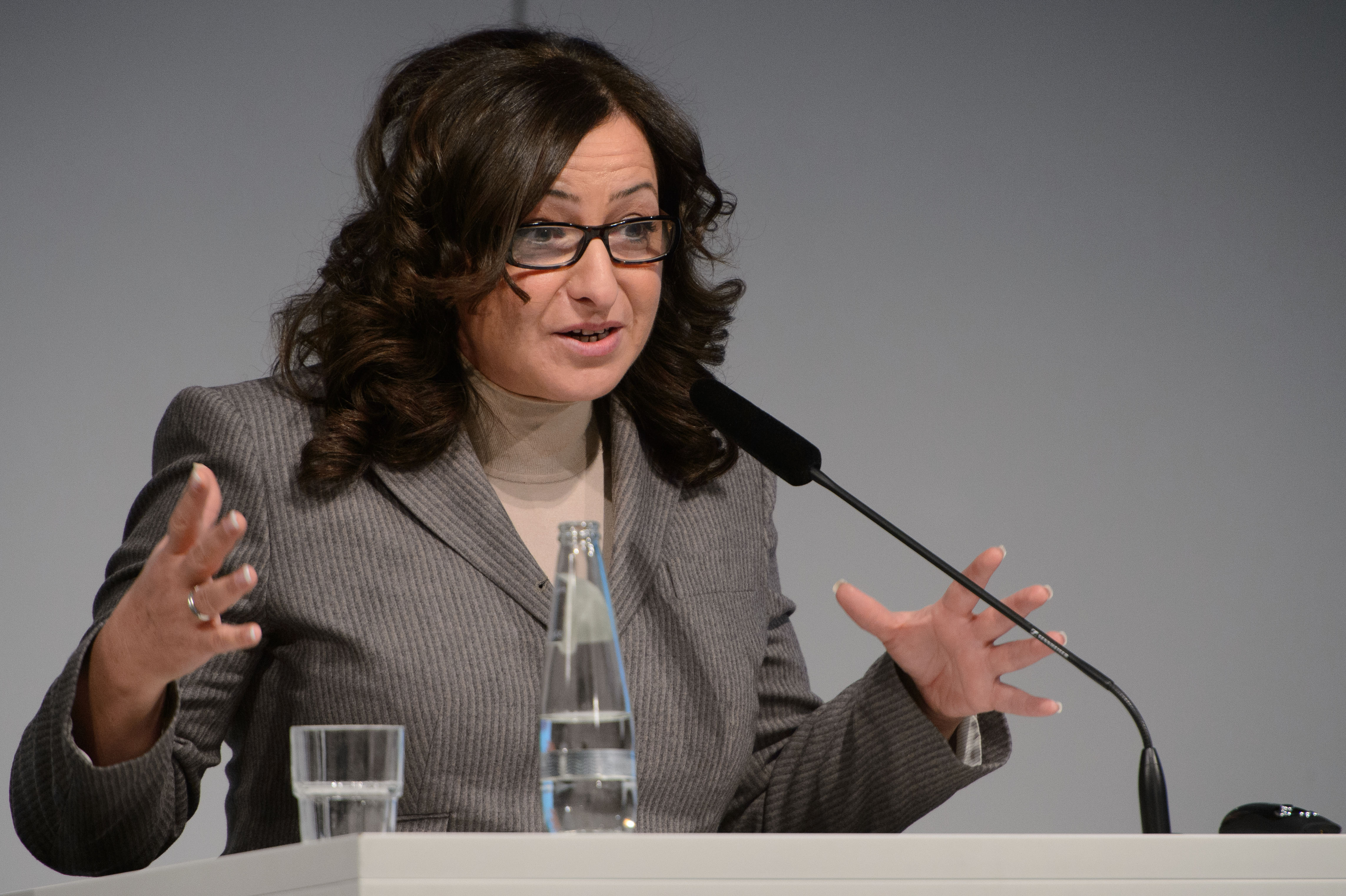
- Kalayci in 2013

Senator for Health, Nursing and Equality of Berlin
- In office 8 December 2016 – 20 December 2021
- Governing Mayor: Michael Müller
- Preceded by: Mario Czaja
- Succeeded by: Ulrike Gote

Deputy Governing Mayor of Berlin
- In office 11 December 2014 – 8 December 2016 Serving with Frank Henkel
- Governing Mayor: Michael Müller
- Preceded by: Michael Müller
- Succeeded by: Ramona Pop

Senator for Labour, Integration and Women of Berlin
- In office 24 November 2011 – 8 December 2016
- Governing Mayor: Klaus Wowereit; Michael Müller
- Preceded by: Carola Bluhm
- Succeeded by: Elke Breitenbach

Member of the Abgeordnetenhaus of Berlin for Tempelhof-Schöneberg 3
- Incumbent
- Assumed office 21 October 2001
- Preceded by: Dieter Nippert

Personal details
- Born: Dilek Demirel; 7 February 1967 (age 59) Kelkit, Turkey
- Party: Social Democratic Party.
- Spouse(s): Kenan Kolat (1989–2017); Hivzi Kalayci (2019–)
- Education: Technische Universität Berlin
- Website: www.dilek-kalayci.de

Dilek Kalayci (German pronunciation: [kaˈlaɪtʃi]; Turkish: Kalaycı Turkish pronunciation: [kaˈɫajdʒɯ]; née Demirel, formerly Kolat, born 7 February 1967) is a Turkish-German politician of the Social Democratic Party (SPD) who served as State Minister for Health, Care and Equality (2016–2021) and as Deputy Governing Mayor of Berlin and State Minister for Labour, Integration and Women (2014–2016) in the government of Mayor Michael Müller.

== Early life and education ==
Kalayci has lived in Germany since she was three years old.

Kalayci studied Mathematical economics at Technische Universität Berlin, after that she worked at the Deutsche Kreditbank.

== Political career ==
From 1995 until 1999, Kalayci was a member of the borough council of Schöneberg and the deputy leader of the SPD group in the council.

In the 2001 state elections, Kalayci won the Tempelhof-Schöneberg 3 constituency with 39.6% of the vote. She was able to defend her constituency in all subsequent elections. Between 2006 and 2011, Kalayci was the deputy leader of the SPD group in the Berlin Abgeordenetenhaus.

In November 2011 Berlin's Governing Mayor, Klaus Wowereit appointed Kalayci State Minister for Labour, Integration and Women, a post she held until 2016. After Wowereit's resignation in 2014 and Michael Müller's election as Governing Mayor she succeeded him as Deputy Governing Mayor in December 2014.

After the 2016 state elections, Kalayci became State Minister for Health, Care and Equality in December 2016, she was not reappointed as Deputy Governing Mayor, being succeeded by the Green Party politician Ramona Pop.

As one of the state’s representatives at the Bundesrat from 2011 until 2021, Kalayci was a member of the Committee on Health. She was also a member of the German-Russian Friendship Group set up by the Bundesrat and the Russian Federation Council.

== Other activities ==
=== Corruption ===
In 2025 she was sentenced to one and a half years for accepting free services from a company for her own wedding in exchange for awarding that same company a contract from her office. Kalayci appealed the decision, but the Federal Court of Justice confirmed it in December 2025. Based on the conviction, Berlin initiated steps to deny Dilek Kalayci further State Minister pension payments in early 2026.

=== Corporate boards ===
- Berliner Sparkasse, Member of the Advisory Board
- Vivantes, Ex-Officio Member of the Supervisory Board (2016–2021)

=== Non-profit organizations ===
- Deutsches Herzzentrum Berlin, Member of the Board of Trustees
- German-Israeli Association (DIG), Member
- Kaiserin Friedrich-Stiftung für das ärztliche Fortbildungswesen, member of the board of trustees
- German United Services Trade Union (ver.di), member
- Checkpoint Charlie Museum, Member of the Board of Trustees

== Personal life ==
Kalayci lives in Berlin's Lichterfelde district. From 1989 until 2017 she was married to Kenan Kolat, and in 2019 she married Hivzi Kalayci.
