= Sybille von Obernitz =

German politician

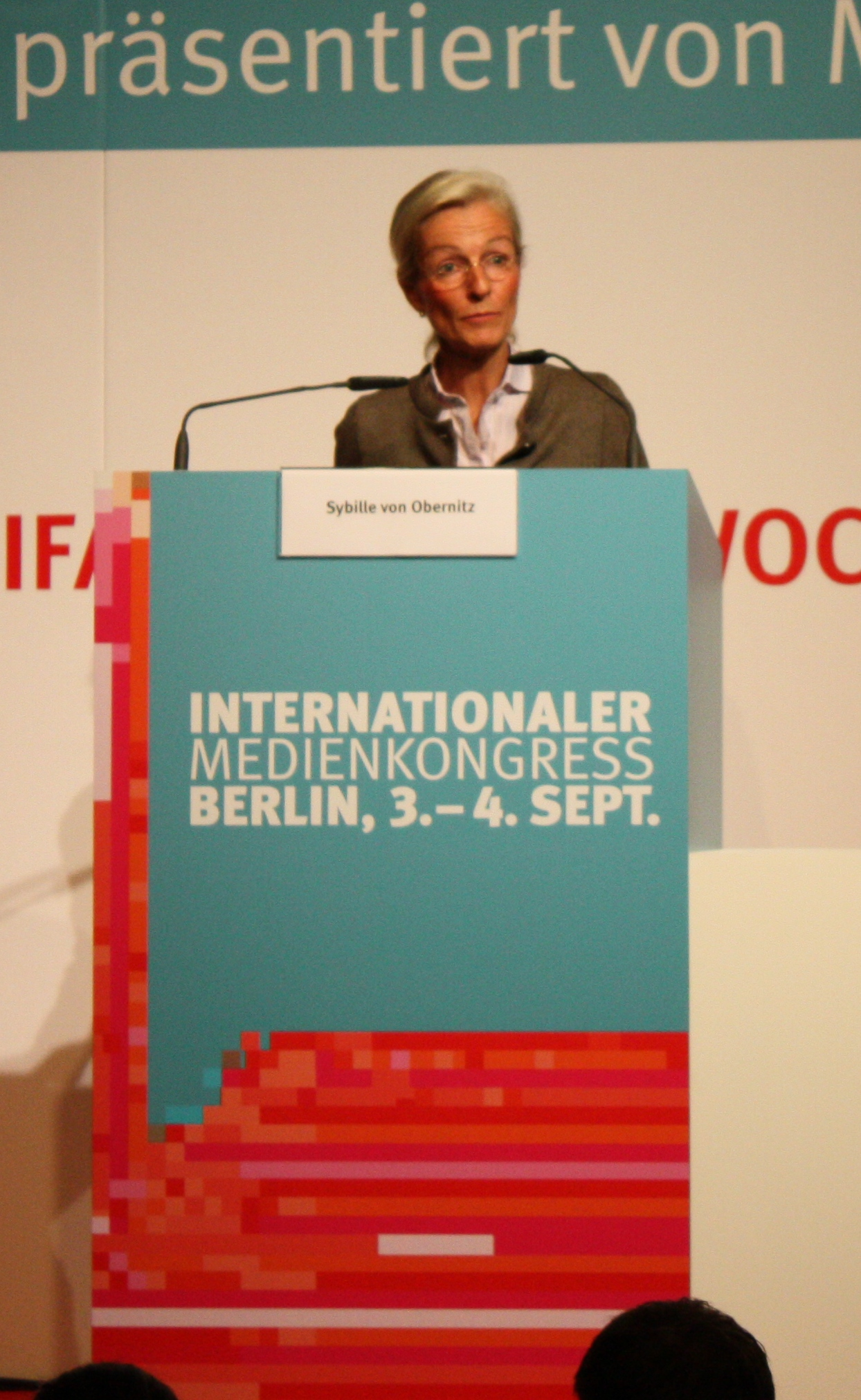
- Sybille von Obernitz

Senator for Economics, Technology, and Research of Berlin
- In office December 1, 2011 – September 11, 2012

Personal details
- Born: March 11, 1962 (age 64) Augsburg
- Party: CDU
- Occupation: Politician

Sybille von Obernitz (March 11, 1962, in Augsburg) is a German economist and politician. She served as the Senator for Economics, Technology, and Research in Berlin from December 1, 2011, until September 11, 2012, upon the recommendation of the CDU.

== Early life ==
Von Obernitz completed her high school education in 1981 at the Anna Barbara von Stetten Institute in Augsburg. Later, she studied Political Science, History, and later Economics from 1981 to 1987 in Freiburg and Munich, graduating with a degree in economics from the University of Freiburg in 1987.

== Career ==
After completing her studies, Sybille von Obernitz initially worked as a consultant in the fields of economics and executive management at the Augsburg Chamber of Industry and Commerce. In 1997, she moved to Berlin with her family for personal reasons. There, she worked for approximately three years, initially as a personal consultant to the president and CEO of the Berlin Chamber of Commerce and Industry. From 2001 to 2003, she headed the department of education and science policy.

In 2004, she transitioned to the German Association of Chambers of Industry and Commerce (DIHK), where she led the area of vocational education and education policy from July 2005 until her appointment as a senator. From 2004 until her departure from DIHK, Sybille von Obernitz was a member of the Main Committee of the Federal Institute for Vocational Education and Training (BiBB), advising the federal government on 'fundamental issues of vocational training.' In 2010, von Obernitz was also a member of the Federal Youth Council. From January 1, 2016, until February 28, 2021, von Obernitz served as the CEO of the Chamber of Industry and Commerce Kassel-Marburg.

On December 1, 2011, Sybille von Obernitz was appointed as the Senator for Economics, Technology, and Research of the State of Berlin. In the summer of 2012, Obernitz faced heavy criticism for the announcement of the position of CEO at Messe Berlin, which was released without involvement from the supervisory board. As a result, CDU state chairman Frank Henkel deemed further cooperation no longer viable, leading Sybille von Obernitz to request resignation on September 8, 2012. She justified her resignation by citing insufficient support. The governing mayor Klaus Wowereit dismissed the senator from her position on September 11, 2012, thereby enabling her to receive transitional benefits.
