= 2016 Berlin state election =

State election in Berlin, Germany

- 18 September 2016

All 160 seats in the Abgeordnetenhaus of Berlin 81 seats needed for a majority
- Turnout: 1,662,598 (66.9%) ▲6.7%
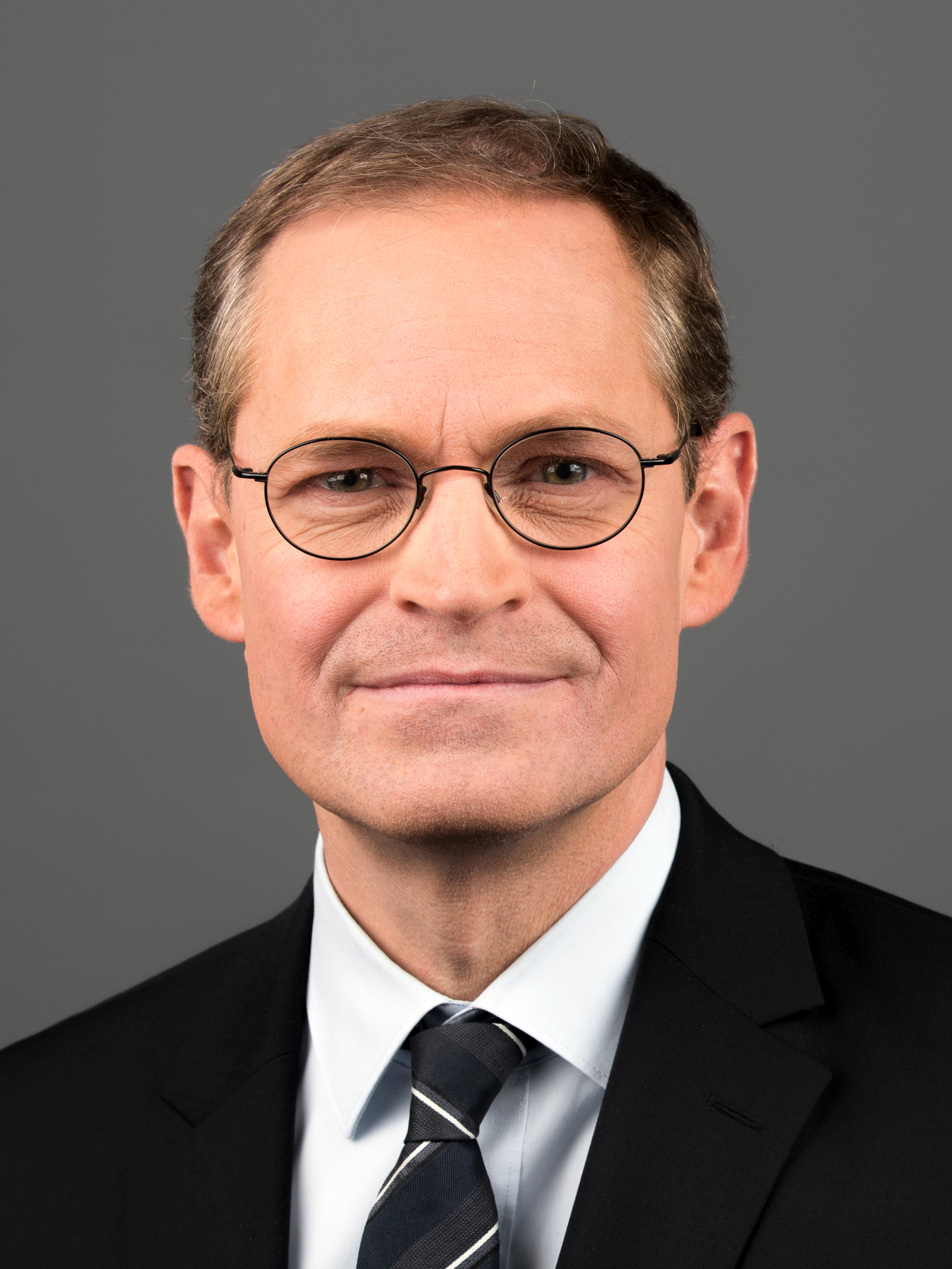

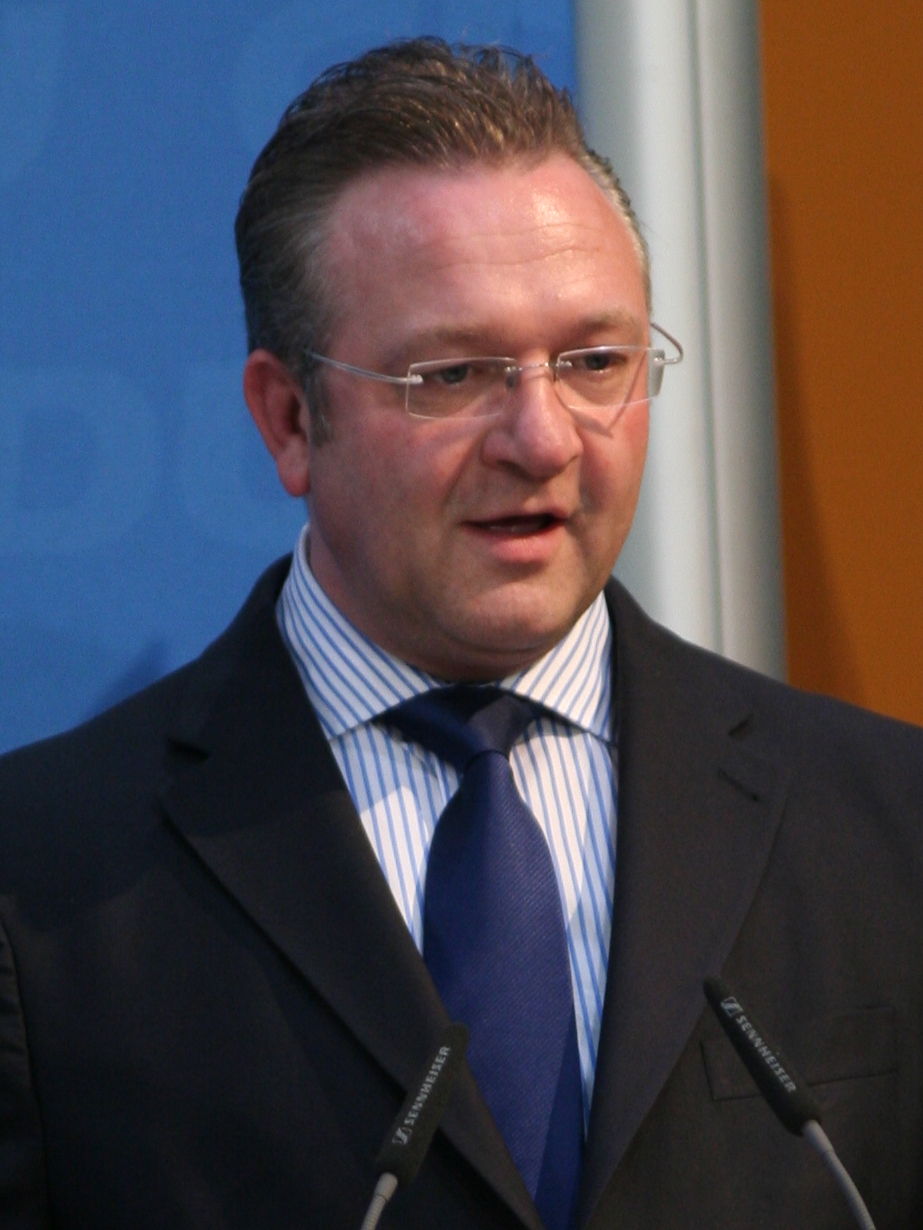

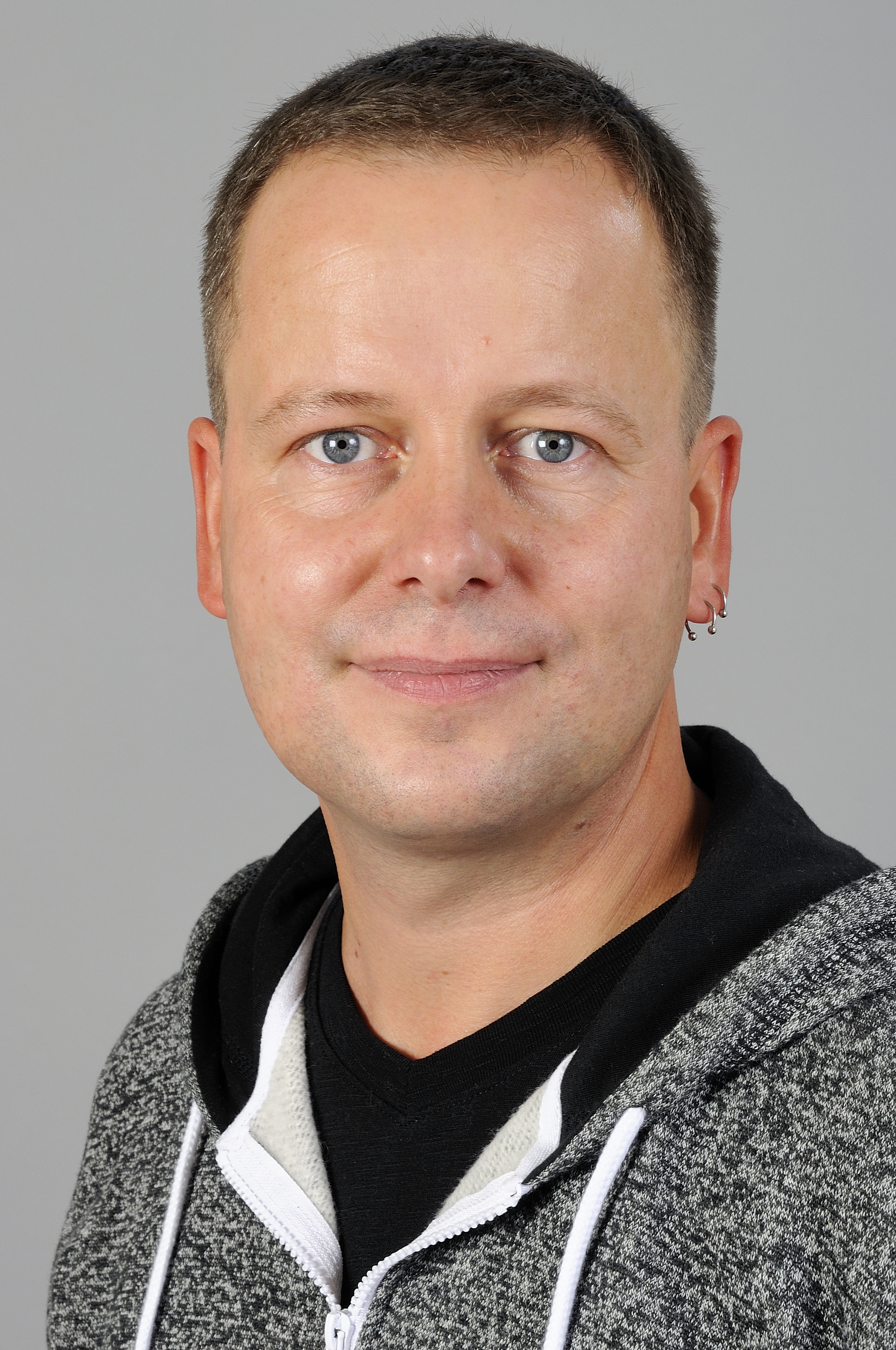

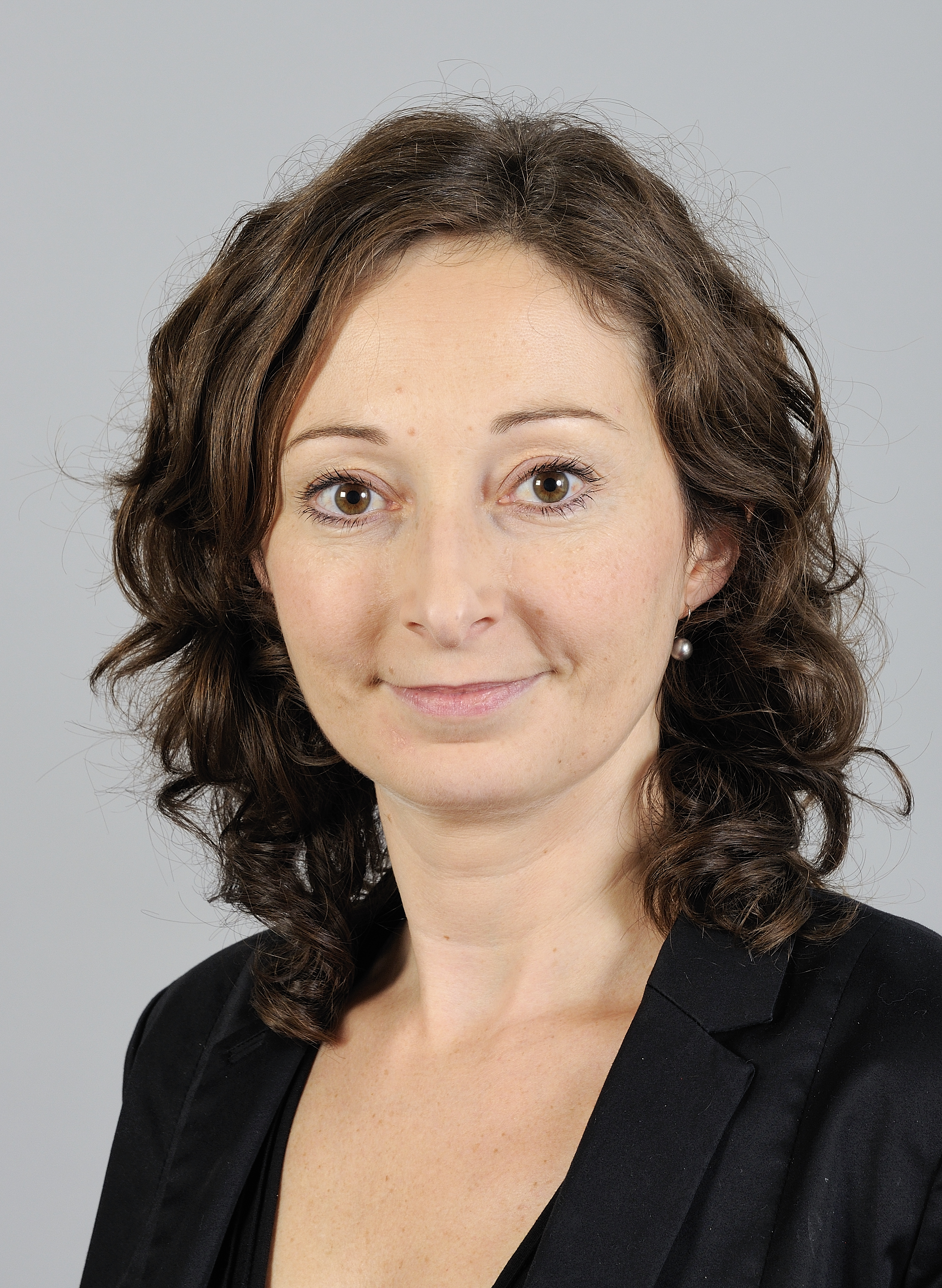

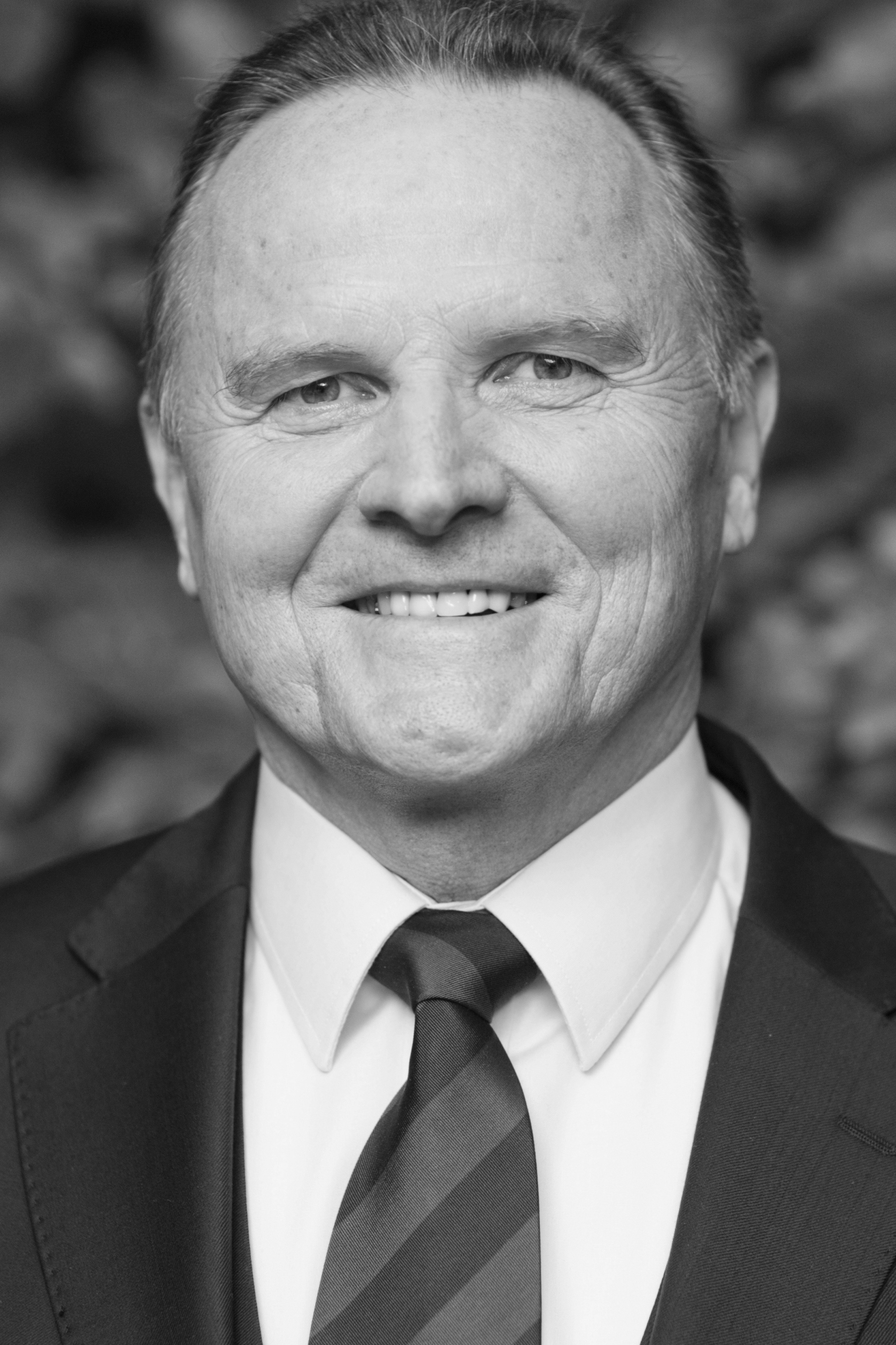

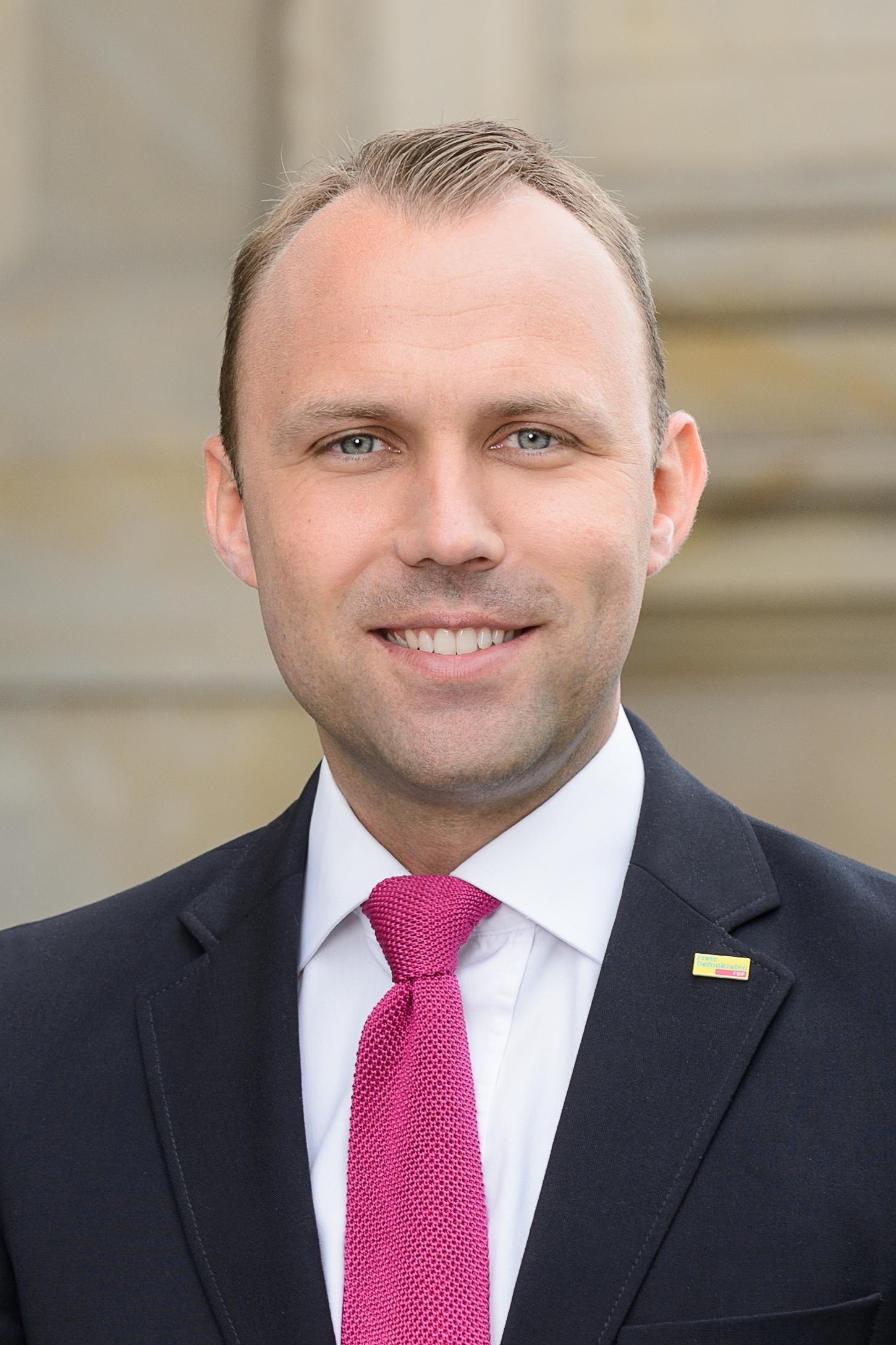

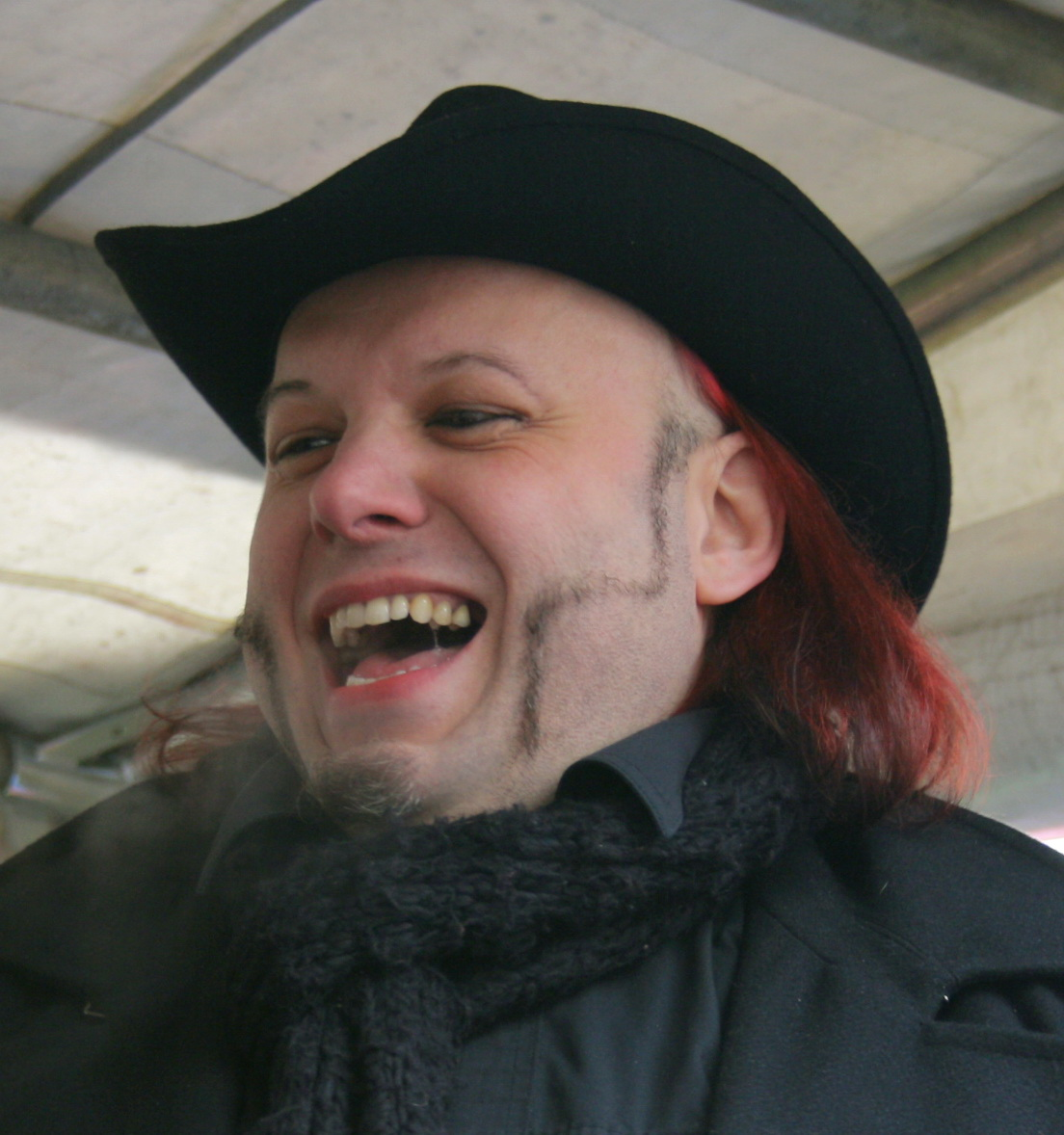
	First party	Second party	Third party
Leader	Michael Müller	Frank Henkel	Klaus Lederer
Party	SPD	CDU	Left
Last election	48 seats, 28.3%	39 seats, 23.4%	20 seats, 11.6%
Seats won	38	31	27
Seat change	▼10	▼8	▲7
Popular vote	352,369	288,002	255,740
Percentage	21.6%	17.6%	15.6%
Swing	▼6.7%	▼5.7%	▲3.9%
	Fourth party	Fifth party	Sixth party
Leader	Ramona Pop	Georg Pazderski	Sebastian Czaja
Party	Greens	AfD	FDP
Last election	30 seats, 17.6%	New party	0 seats, 1.8%
Seats won	27	25	12
Seat change	▼3	▲25	▲12
Popular vote	248,243	231,325	109,431
Percentage	15.2%	14.2%	6.7%
Swing	▼2.4%	New party	▲4.9%
	Seventh party
Leader	Bruno Kramm
Party	Pirates
Last election	15 seats, 8.9%
Seats won	0
Seat change	▼15
Popular vote	28,321
Percentage	1.7%
Swing	▼7.2%
- Results for single-member constituencies.
Mayor before election
Michael Müller
SPD
Elected Mayor
Michael Müller
SPD

The 2016 Berlin state election was held on 18 September 2016 to elect the members to the 18th Abgeordnetenhaus of Berlin. The incumbent grand coalition of the Social Democratic Party (SPD) and Christian Democratic Union (CDU) was defeated, with both parties suffering significant losses. The Left (Die Linke) became the third largest party, while the fourth-placed Greens suffered losses. Alternative for Germany (AfD) won seats for the first time. The Free Democratic Party (FDP) re-entered the Abgeordnetenhaus after falling out in the 2011 election. The Pirate Party, which had achieved state-level representation for the first time in the previous election, lost all of its seats.

After the election, the SPD formed a coalition with The Left and Greens. Mayor Michael Müller was subsequently re-elected.

== Opinion polling ==
=== Party polling ===
Polling firm	Fieldwork date	Sample size	SPD	CDU	Grüne	Linke	Piraten	FDP	AfD	Others	Lead
2016 state election	18 Sep 2016	–	21.6	17.6	15.2	15.6	1.7	6.7	14.2	7.4	4.0
Forschungsgruppe Wahlen	14–15 Sep 2016	1,420	23	18	15	14.5	–	6.5	14	9	5
Forsa	5–14 Sep 2016	1,005	24	17	17	15	3	5	13	6	7
INSA	5–9 Sep 2016	1,000	22	18	18	14	–	6	14	8	4
Forschungsgruppe Wahlen	6–8 Sep 2016	1,334	24	19	15	14	–	5	14	9	5
Infratest dimap	6–7 Sep 2016	1,002	21	19	16	15	–	5	15	9	2
Forsa	16–25 Aug 2016	1,009	24	17	19	17	–	5	10	8	5
Infratest dimap	11–15 Aug 2016	1,001	21	20	17	16	–	5	15	6	1
INSA	2–9 Aug 2016	1,000	23	18	19	15	3	5	14	3	4
Forsa	18–28 Jul 2016	1,002	26	18	20	16	–	5	8	7	6
Infratest dimap	7–11 Jul 2016	1,000	21	20	19	18	–	4	13	5	1
INSA	23 Jun–4 Jul 2016	1,003	21	19	19	18	1	4	14	4	2
Forsa	20–30 Jun 2016	1,001	27	18	19	14	–	6	8	8	8
Infratest dimap	9–13 Jun 2016	1,000	23	18	19	17	–	4	15	4	4
Forsa	17–25 May 2016	1,003	26	18	20	14	3	5	8	6	6
Infratest dimap	4–9 May 2016	1,003	23	19	18	16	–	4	15	5	4
Forsa	18–28 Apr 2016	1,002	27	18	20	14	3	6	7	5	7
Infratest dimap	7–11 Apr 2016	1,000	23	21	17	16	–	5	13	5	2
Forsa	14–23 Mar 2016	1,001	27	19	18	14	2	6	9	5	8
Forsa	15–25 Feb 2016	1,003	29	21	17	14	3	4	7	5	8
Infratest dimap	18–23 Feb 2016	1,004	25	21	19	16	–	4	10	5	4
Forsa	18–28 Jan 2016	1,002	29	20	18	15	3	3	7	5	9
Forsa	7–17 Dec 2015	1,005	29	23	17	14	3	4	5	5	6
Forsa	16–26 Nov 2015	1,001	30	22	18	15	3	3	4	5	8
Infratest dimap	12–16 Nov 2015	1,000	27	23	17	14	2	3	9	5	4
Forsa	19–29 Oct 2015	1,003	29	22	16	17	4	4	3	5	7
Forsa	14–24 Sep 2015	1,001	29	23	18	15	3	2	3	7	6
Forsa	17–27 Aug 2015	1,006	29	23	18	16	4	–	2	8	6
Forsa	21–30 Jul 2015	1,003	29	24	17	15	3	–	3	9	5
Forsa	15–24 Jun 2015	1,001	27	24	17	16	4	–	4	8	3
Forsa	22–28 May 2015	1,005	28	24	16	15	5	–	4	8	4
Forsa	17–29 Apr 2015	1,005	29	25	16	14	4	–	4	8	4
Forsa	18–26 Mar 2015	1,002	29	23	17	15	4	–	4	8	6
Infratest dimap	20–24 Mar 2015	1,001	28	26	18	14	3	–	5	6	2
Forsa	16–26 Feb 2015	1,002	29	25	18	13	3	4	4	4	4
Forsa	19–29 Jan 2015	1,003	27	26	18	14	3	3	5	4	1
Forsa	17–27 Nov 2014	1,009	27	27	19	13	3	–	4	7	Tie
Forsa	October 2014	1,003	26	26	19	15	3	–	5	5	Tie
Infratest dimap	20–21 Oct 2014	1,001	27	26	17	16	3	–	7	4	1
Forsa	8–18 Sep 2014	1,007	25	27	18	14	3	–	7	6	2
Forsa	19–28 Aug 2014	1,003	24	29	19	14	4	–	4	6	5
Forsa	21–31 Jul 2014	1,003	21	28	21	15	4	–	4	7	7
Forsa	16–26 Jun 2014	1,003	23	28	19	15	4	–	4	7	5
Forsa	20–28 May 2014	1,008	21	26	19	15	6	–	6	7	5
Infratest dimap	8–12 May 2014	1,001	24	28	16	18	4	–	4	6	4
Forsa	22–30 Apr 2014	1,002	23	30	16	15	5	–	5	6	7
Forsa	17–27 Mar 2014	1,002	23	29	16	18	4	–	3	7	6
Forsa	February 2014	1,003	23	27	18	17	4	–	4	7	4
Infratest dimap	7 Feb 2014	800	26	26	18	14	4	–	5	7	Tie
Forsa	20–29 Jan 2014	1,006	26	25	18	15	4	–	4	8	1
Infratest dimap	6–9 Dec 2013	1,000	26	29	16	17	3	–	4	5	3
Forsa	December 2013	1,003	26	27	17	15	5	–	4	6	1
Forsa	18–28 Nov 2013	1,001	26	28	17	15	4	–	4	6	2
Forsa	21–31 Oct 2013	1,002	27	27	16	16	3	–	5	6	Tie
Forsa	17–26 Sep 2013	1,003	26	28	19	14	3	–	4	6	2
Infratest dimap	5–9 Sep 2013	1,752	29	26	18	14	5	2	2	4	3
Forsa	20–29 Aug 2013	1,001	25	27	21	12	5	–	4	6	2
Forsa	16–25 Jul 2013	1,005	26	28	22	11	3	–	–	10	2
Forsa	19–27 Jun 2013	1,004	27	26	22	12	4	–	–	9	1
Infratest dimap	7–10 Jun 2013	1,000	26	29	22	11	4	2	–	6	3
Forsa	21–30 May 2013	1,004	26	26	21	12	4	–	–	11	Tie
Forsa	16–25 Apr 2013	1,004	24	28	21	12	5	–	–	10	4
Infratest dimap	12–15 Apr 2013	1,001	24	28	21	13	5	2	–	7	4
Forsa	12–21 Mar 2013	1,006	25	27	24	10	5	–	–	9	2
Forsa	20–28 Feb 2013	1,002	24	29	24	10	6	–	–	7	5
Forsa	21–30 Jan 2013	1,007	25	26	25	10	7	–	–	7	1
Forsa	10–20 Dec 2012	1,004	24	27	22	12	6	–	–	9	3
Infratest dimap	30 Nov–3 Dec 2012	1,000	25	26	20	14	7	2	–	6	1
Forsa	16–29 Nov 2012	1,008	26	26	22	11	7	–	–	8	Tie
Forsa	17–25 Oct 2012	1,002	26	27	19	10	10	–	–	8	1
Forsa	18–27 Sep 2012	1,004	26	26	19	10	10	–	–	9	Tie
Infratest dimap	14–17 Sep 2012	1,000	27	26	19	12	8	2	–	6	1
Forsa	13–23 Aug 2012	1,007	24	24	20	10	14	–	–	8	Tie
Forsa	17–26 Jul 2012	1,004	25	26	18	10	13	–	–	8	1
Forsa	18–28 Jun 2012	1,001	26	24	18	11	12	–	–	9	2
Infratest dimap	8–11 Jun 2012	1,000	31	25	17	10	10	2	–	5	6
Forsa	14–24 May 2012	1,003	27	22	18	10	15	–	–	8	5
Forsa	17–26 Apr 2012	1,005	28	23	16	10	15	–	–	8	5
Infratest dimap	13–16 Apr 2012	1,000	29	25	16	10	14	1	–	5	4
Forsa	20–29 Mar 2012	1,008	29	24	15	11	13	–	–	8	5
Forsa	23–24 Feb 2012	1,005	29	23	15	10	13	–	–	10	6
Forsa	16–26 Jan 2012	1,002	29	22	16	14	10	–	–	9	7
Forsa	December 2011	?	28	24	16	11	11	1	–	9	4
Infratest dimap	2–5 Dec 2011	1,000	32	25	16	11	9	2	–	5	7
Forsa	15–24 Nov 2011	1,005	31	24	14	11	10	1	–	9	7
Forsa	18–27 Oct 2011	1,004	29	24	15	11	11	2	–	8	5
Forsa	20–28 Sep 2011	1,008	29	24	15	11	10	2	–	9	5
2011 state election	18 Sep 2011	–	28.3	23.3	17.6	11.6	8.9	1.8	–	8.3	5.0

=== Former West Berlin ===
Polling firm	Fieldwork date	Sample size	SPD	CDU	Grüne	Linke	FDP	AfD	Others	Lead
2016 state election	2016	–	22.9	20.8	20.3	10.1	7.9	6.3	8.1	
Infratest dimap	08.09.2016	–	22	22	18	10		13		
Infratest dimap	17.08.2016	–	22	23	20	9		13		
Infratest dimap	13.07.2016	–	21	23	23	12		12		
Infratest dimap	15.06.2016	–	24	20	23	10		13		
Infratest dimap	11.05.2016	–	23	23	19	11		14		
Infratest dimap	13.04.2016	–	22	25	18	11		13		
Infratest dimap	25.02.2016	–	24	24	22	12		9		
Infratest dimap	20.11.2015	–	28	27	20	8		7		
Infratest dimap	25.03.2015	–	29	30	20	8		5		
Infratest dimap	22.10.2014	–	28	30	19	9		7		
Infratest dimap	14.05.2014	–	26	32	18	10		4		
Infratest dimap	08.02.2014	–	27	31	20	9		3		
Infratest dimap	11.12.2013	–	27	31	19	11		4		
Infratest dimap	11.09.2013	–	29	30	19	7		2		
Infratest dimap	12.06.2013	–	25	34	24	6				
Infratest dimap	17.04.2013	–	25	34	24	6				
Infratest dimap	05.12.2012	–	24	32	25	6				
Infratest dimap	19.09.2012	–	28	29	22	6				
Infratest dimap	13.06.2012	–	31	29	19	3				
Infratest dimap	18.04.2012	–	29	31	18	4				
Infratest dimap	07.12.2011	–	30	31	19	4				
2011 state election	2011	–	27.9	29.5	20.3	4.3	2.3			

=== Former East Berlin ===
Polling firm	Fieldwork date	Sample size	SPD	CDU	Grüne	Linke	FDP	AfD	Others	Lead
2016 state election	2016	–	19.3	13.1	12.6	23.4	1.9	17.0		
Infratest dimap	08.09.2016	–	19	13	14	23		18		
Infratest dimap	17.08.2016	–	20	15	12	26		18		
Infratest dimap	13.07.2016	–	21	15	13	25		16		
Infratest dimap	15.06.2016	–	22	14	12	27		19		
Infratest dimap	11.05.2016	–	23	14	16	22		18		
Infratest dimap	13.04.2016	–	24	16	15	23		14		
Infratest dimap	25.02.2016	–	26	17	15	21		12		
Infratest dimap	20.11.2015	–	25	18	12	25		12		
Infratest dimap	25.03.2015	–	26	21	14	24	4	5		
Infratest dimap	22.10.2014	–	25	21	13	27	3	7		
Infratest dimap	14.05.2014	–	21	22	11	30	5	4		
Infratest dimap	08.02.2014	–	25	20	15	21	5	7		
Infratest dimap	11.12.2013	–	24	25	12	26	3	4		
Infratest dimap	11.09.2013	–	29	20	17	23	5	2		
Infratest dimap	12.06.2013	–	27	21	18	19	5			
Infratest dimap	17.04.2013	–	23	19	16	24	8			
Infratest dimap	05.12.2012	–	27	18	13	26	8			
Infratest dimap	19.09.2012	–	26	20	16	22	8			
Infratest dimap	13.06.2012	–	30	18	14	21	11			
Infratest dimap	18.04.2012	–	29	17	13	18	16			
Infratest dimap	07.12.2011	–	35	17	12	22	9			
2011 state election	2011	–	28.8	14.2	13.5	22.7	1.2			

== Election result ==
< 2011 Next >

Summary of the 18 September 2016 Abgeordnetenhaus of Berlin elections results
Party	Popular vote			Seats	
Party	Votes	%	+/–	Seats	+/–
Social Democratic Party of Germany; Sozialdemokratische Partei Deutschlands – SPD	352,369	21.6	▼6.7	38	▼10
Christian Democratic Union; Christlich Demokratische Union Deutschlands – CDU	288,002	17.6	▼5.8	31	▼8
The Left; Die Linke	255,740	15.6	▲4.0	27	▲7
Alliance '90/The Greens; Bündnis 90/Die Grünen	248,243	15.2	▼2.4	27	▼3
Alternative for Germany; Alternative für Deutschland – AfD	231,325	14.2	▲14.2	25	▲25
Free Democratic Party; Freie Demokratische Partei – FDP	109,431	6.7	▲4.9	12	▲12
Die PARTEI; Partei für Arbeit, Rechtstaat, Tierschutz, Elitenförderung und basisdemokratische Initiative	31,908	2.0	▲1.1	–	–
Animal Protection Party; Tierschutzpartei	30,565	1.9	▲0.4	–	–
Pirate Party; Piratenpartei Deutschland	28,321	1.7	▼7.2	–	▼15
Graue Panther; Allianz Graue Panther Deutschland	18,135	1.1	▲1.1	–	–
Other parties	40,717	2.4	–	–	–
Valid votes	1,634,756	98.5%	▲0.1		
Invalid votes	25,690	1.5%	▼0.1		
Totals and voter turnout	1,662,598	66.9%	▲6.7	160	▲8
Electorate	2,485,363	100.00	—		

	SPD	CDU/CSU	Linke	Grüne	FDP	AfD	Others	Pirates
West Berlin	23.2	20.9	10.1	17.1	8.6	12.1	6.4	1.6
East Berlin	19.3	13.1	23.4	12.6	4.0	17.0	8.6	1.9
