= Ingo Schmitt =

German politician

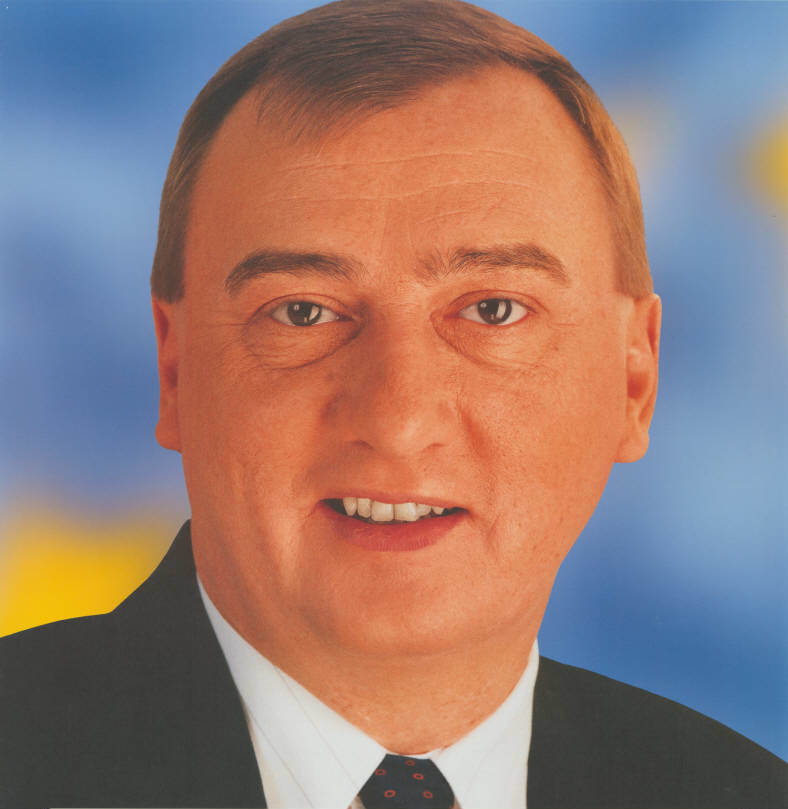
Ingo Schmitt as seen in a photograph taken from an election poster in 1999

Ingo Schmitt is a German politician and political scientist. He was a member of the conservative Christian Democratic Unionfrom 1975 to 2014. From 1991 to 1999 he was Secretary of State of Berlin. He then served as a Member of the European Parliament for Berlin from 1999 to 2005. On 18 September 2005 he was elected to the Bundestag and consequently resigned from the European Parliament. From 2005 to 2009 he was a member of the Landesgruppe Berlin of the CDU/CSU-Bundestagsfraktion and from 2005 to 2008 he was a member of the CDU Berlin.

== Education and legal career ==
In 1976 Schmitt graduated from the Wald-Oberschule in West Berlin. He then graduated from law school at the Free University of Berlin.In 1986, after completing his legal traineeship, he passed the state examination. From 1986 to 1991 and from 1999 he practiced law.
