= Wolfgang Wieland =

German lawyer and politician (1948–2023)

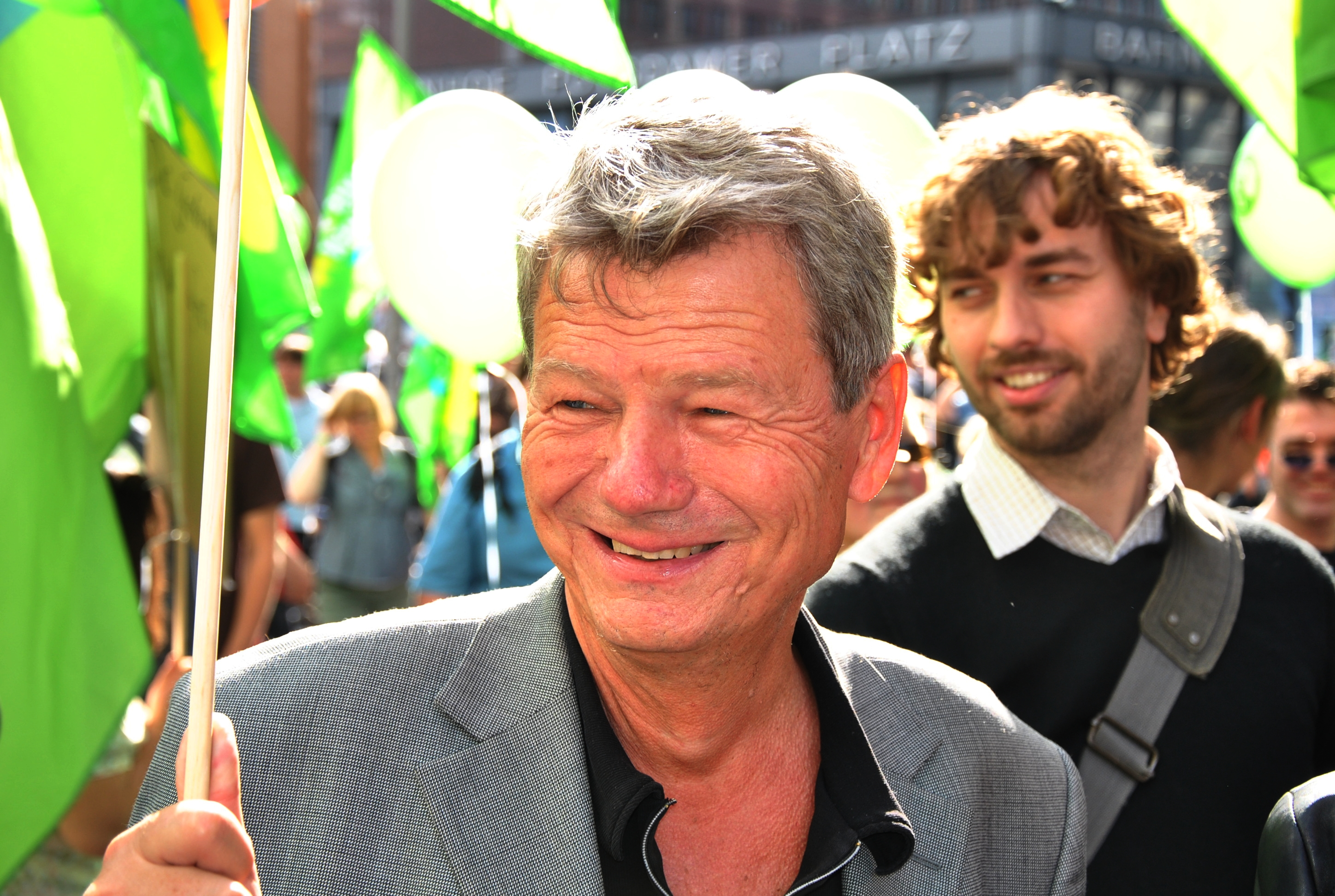
- Wieland in 2006

Member of the Bundestag
- In office 18 October 2005 – 22 October 2013

Personal details
- Born: 9 March 1948 Berlin, Germany
- Died: 5 December 2023 (aged 75)
- Party: Alliance 90/The Greens
- Education: Goethe University Frankfurt; Free University of Berlin
- Occupation: Lawyer; politician

Wolfgang Wieland (9 March 1948 – 5 December 2023) was a German lawyer and politician. He was a co-founder of the Berlin Alternative Liste (AL), a precursor of the Alliance 90/The Greens. He was a member of the parliament of the city of Berlin from 1987 to 1989 (AL) and from 1991 to 2004.

As a lawyer he defended Fritz Teufel of the Außerparlamentarische Opposition (APO), and represented the joint plaintiff in the Mykonos restaurant assassinations, among others.

== Life and career ==
Wieland was born in Berlin on 9 March 1948. He grew up in a Protestant family in Frankfurt where he completed school with the Abitur. He studied law first in Frankfurt and from 1967 at the Free University of Berlin. On 2 June he took part in a Außerparlamentarische Opposition (APO) demonstration where he witnessed the killing of Benno Ohnesorg by a policeman. Wieland said he identified with Ohnesorg as the attack could have happened to anyone. Wieland completed the first state exam in 1973 and the second in 1976.

=== Lawyer ===
Wieland worked in a Sozietät of lawyers from 1977. In 1978 to 1980, he defended Fritz Teufel, one of the leading figures of the APO, who was accused of involvement in the murder of Günter von Drenkmann, President of the Court of Appeal, and in the kidnapping of Peter Lorenz. He represented the joint plaintiff in the Mykonos restaurant assassinations of survivors of the Islamist attack in Berlin-Wilmersdorf in 1992 commissioned by the secret service of the Iranian mullah regime.

=== Political career ===
In 1978, Wieland was a founding member of The Greens in Berlin, then named Alternative Liste für Demokratie und Umweltschutz (AL).

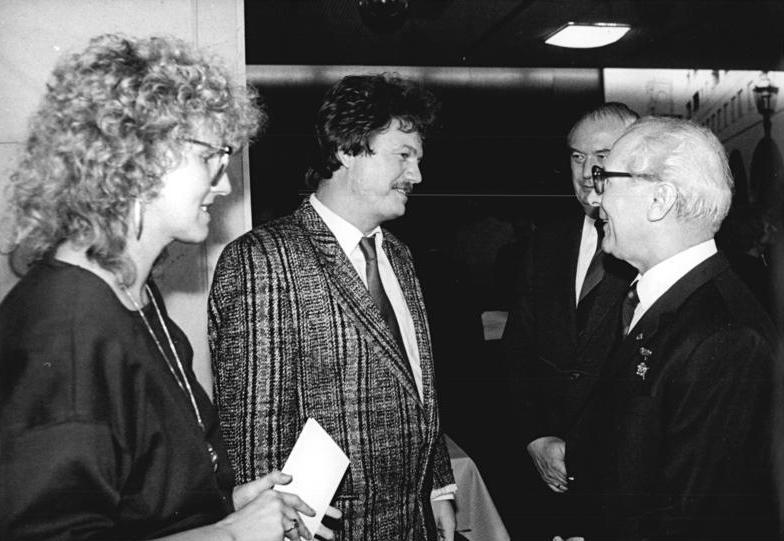
Wieland in 1987 at an event to celebrate Berlin's 750th anniversary, with Erich Honecker

The AL entered the Berlin city parliament in 1987; Wieland was a member until 1989, and again for the Greens from 1991 to 2004, often as leader of the faction. He was the voice of criticism from the opposition of the grand coalition of mayor Eberhard Diepgen (CDU) and Klaus Böger (SPD). After that coalition broke in 2001, he served as senator of justice from June 2001 to January 2002, under mayor Klaus Wowereit, until Wowereit formed a red-red coalition.

In September 2004, Wieland was a candidate for the Greens in Brandenburg. He was a member of the Bundestag from 2005 to 2013, mostly interested in interior politics and security.

=== Memberships ===
Wieland was a member of several organisations. In Berlin, he was on the board of the Deutsche Gesellschaft (German Society) and the Deutsche Vereinigung für Parlamentsfragen (German association for parliamentary questions). He served as vice president of the Förderkreis Denkmal für die ermordeten Juden Europas, for the Memorial to the Murdered Jews of Europe. He was member of the foundation council of the Stiftung zur Aufarbeitung der SED-Diktatur (Federal Foundation for the Reappraisal of the SED Dictatorship). He was a member of the Volksbund Deutsche Kriegsgräberfürsorge in Kassel, maintaining the graves of soldiers of the World Wars.

=== Personal life ===
Wieland was married to a judge; the couple had two daughters. He said in a 2003 interview that he had no intentions of leaving Berlin because of the family, and therefore had no ambitions for national politics with Bonn as the seat of the Bundestag.

Wieland died on 5 December 2023, at age 75, after a serious illness.
