= Cornelia Yzer =

German politician

Member of the Bundestag
- In office 20 December 1990 – 22 January 1997

Personal details
- Born: 28 July 1961 (age 64) Lüdenscheid
- Party: CDU

Cornelia Yzer (born 28 July 1961) is a German politician of the Christian Democratic Union (CDU) and former member of the German Bundestag.

== Life ==
From 1990 to 1998 Yzer was a member of the German Bundestag as a directly elected member of the constituency Märkischer Kreis I (NRW). On 3 May 1992 she was appointed Parliamentary State Secretary to the then Federal Minister for Women and Youth Angela Merkel in the Federal Government led by Helmut Kohl. After the 1994 federal elections, she moved in the same position to the Federal Minister of Education, Science, Research and Technology, where she was responsible in particular for the Research Fields Energy and Environment, Aeronautics and Space, Multimedia and Biotechnology.

== Literature ==
Herbst, Ludolf; Jahn, Bruno (2002). Vierhaus, Rudolf (ed.). Biographisches Handbuch der Mitglieder des Deutschen Bundestages. 1949–2002 [Biographical Handbook of the Members of the German Bundestag. 1949–2002] (in German). München: De Gruyter - De Gruyter Saur. p. 1715. ISBN 978-3-11-184511-1.
