= Frank Henkel =

German politician

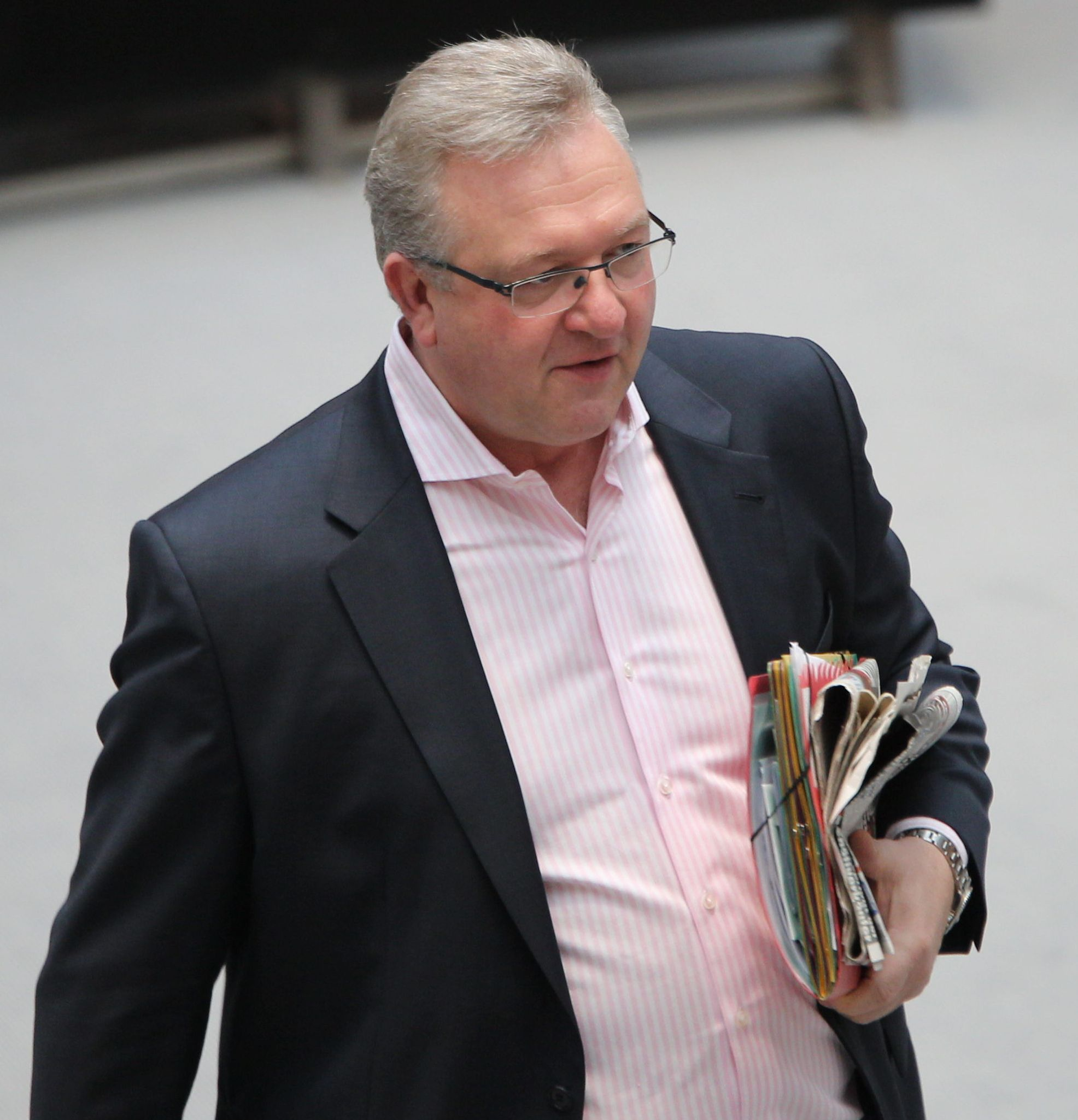
- Henkel in 2016

Deputy Governing Mayor of Berlin
- In office 24 November 2011 – 8 December 2016
- Governing Mayor: Klaus Wowereit; Michael Müller
- Preceded by: Harald Wolf
- Succeeded by: Klaus Lederer

Senator for the Interior and Sport of Berlin
- In office 24 November 2011 – 8 December 2016
- Governing Mayor: Klaus Wowereit; Michael Müller
- Preceded by: Ehrhart Körting
- Succeeded by: Andreas Geisel

Leader of the Christian Democratic Union in Berlin
- In office 18 November 2008 – 2 December 2016
- Deputy: Monika Grütters
- Preceded by: Ingo Schmitt
- Succeeded by: Monika Grütters

Leader of the Christian Democratic Union in the Abgeordnetenhaus of Berlin
- In office 11 September 2008 – 1 December 2011
- Preceded by: Friedbert Pflüger
- Succeeded by: Florian Graf

Member of the Abgeordnetenhaus of Berlin
- Incumbent
- Assumed office 21 October 2001
- Constituency: State Wide List

Personal details
- Born: 16 November 1963 (age 62) East Berlin, East Germany
- Education: Berlin School of Economics and Law

Frank Henkel (born 16 November 1963) is a German politician of the Christian Democratic Union (CDU) who served as a Deputy Governing Mayor and Senator of the Interior and Sports of the German state of Berlin from 2011 until 2016.

From 2008 Henkel was the opposition leader in the Abgeordnetenhaus, the state parliament of Berlin, in which he has been an MP since 31 October 2001. In 2011 he led the CDU back into the government as the junior partner in an SPD-led coalition.

== Early life and career ==
Henkel was born and raised in East Berlin and attended Polytechnic Secondary School. He began an apprenticeship after school, but in 1981 the family moved to West Berlin, after their request for departure was granted. In West Berlin he completed vocational training as a wholesale and foreign trade merchant in 1984 and worked for two years at the Friedrich Krupp AG. From 1986 to 1987 he attended technical secondary school and studied economic and social sciences at Berlin School of Economics and Law afterwards. In 1994 he graduated as a Diplom-Kaufmann (German business administration degree, similar to MBA). In addition, he graduated in public relations at German Academy for Public Relations in Frankfurt and in journalism at Free University Berlin.

== Political career ==
Since 1985 Henkel was a member of Junge Union, since 1986 of the CDU. Between 1987 and 2005 he held various political offices in the CDU. He also worked as a speaker in the executive staff of the district mayor of Reinickendorf, Berlin, from 1996 to 2001. In January 2001 he became office manager of Berlin mayor Eberhard Diepgen and in June 2001 office manager of the CDU parliamentary group leader in the Abgeordnetenhaus. In October 2001 he was elected MP in Berlin.

In May 2005 Henkel also was elected Secretary General of the Berlin CDU, serving under the leadership of successive chairmen Ingo Schmitt and Joachim Zeller. From September 2008, he was led the opposition as chairman of the CDU parliamentary group in the Abgeordnetenhaus. In November 2008, he succeeded Zeller as chairman of the state CDU.

=== Senator of the Interior and Sports, 2011–2016 ===
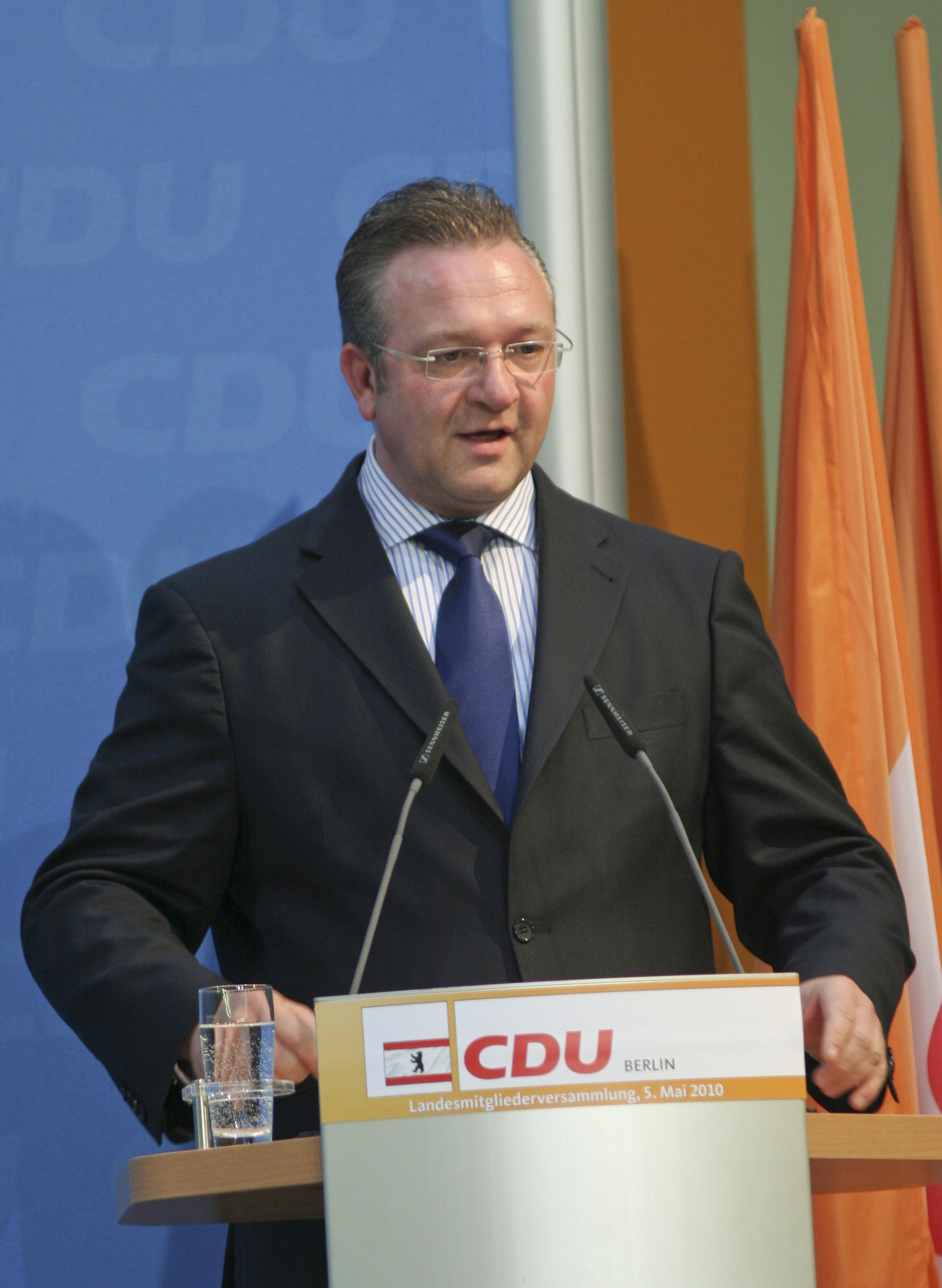
Frank Henkel in 2010

In 2011 Henkel became frontrunner in the 2011 Berlin state elections and led the CDU back into the state government. In March 2016 he was nominated again as the leading candidate of the CDU for the 2016 Berlin state elections. As one of Berlin's representatives at the Bundesrat, Henkel was a member of the Committee on Internal Affairs, the Defense Committee and the German delegation to the NATO Parliamentary Assembly.

In the negotiations to form a Grand Coalition of the Christian Democrats (CDU together with the Bavarian CSU) and the SPD following the 2013 federal elections, Henkel was part of the CDU/CSU delegation in the working group on internal and legal affairs, led by Hans-Peter Friedrich and Thomas Oppermann.

In December 2015, Henkel presided over the CDU's 2014 national convention in Berlin.

Henkel again led his party in the 2016 state elections. Ahead of the vote, he regularly polled behind his Social Democrat counterpart, incumbent Mayor Michael Müller. His party ended up falling from 23 per cent in 2011 to 17.6 per cent, its lowest result in Berlin.

Henkel was a CDU delegate to the Federal Convention for the purpose of electing the President of Germany in 2017.

== Other activities (selection) ==
- Berlin Brandenburg Airport, Member of the Supervisory Board (-2016)
- Olympiastadion Berlin, Member of the Supervisory Board (-2016)
- Berlin School of Economics and Law (HWR), Member of the Board of Trustees
- Technische Universität Berlin, Member of the Board of Trustees
- German Forum for Crime Prevention (DFK), Ex-Officio Member of the Board of Trustees (-2016)
- Hertha BSC, Member
