= Michael Müller (politician, born 1964) =

German politician

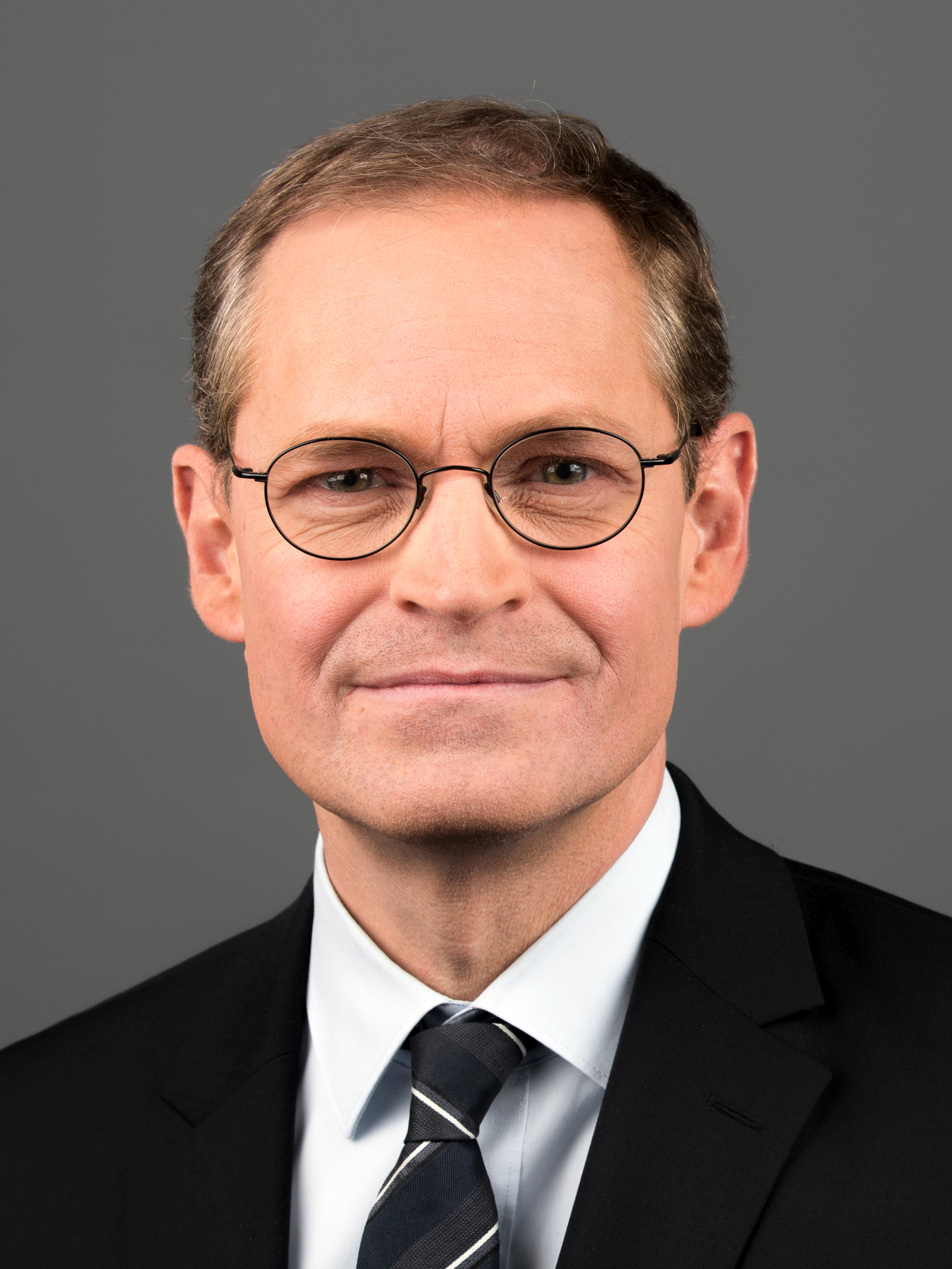
- Müller in 2017

Governing Mayor of Berlin
- In office 11 December 2014 – 21 December 2021
- Deputy: Frank Henkel; Dilek Kalayci; Ramona Pop; Klaus Lederer
- Preceded by: Klaus Wowereit
- Succeeded by: Franziska Giffey

President of the German Bundesrat
- In office 1 November 2017 – 31 October 2018
- First Vice President: Malu Dreyer
- Preceded by: Malu Dreyer
- Succeeded by: Daniel Günther
Berlin state politics (2001–2020)
Leader of the Social Democratic Party in Berlin
In office 30 April 2016 – 28 November 2020
Preceded by	Jan Stöß
Succeeded by	Franziska Giffey; Raed Saleh
In office 7 April 2004 – 9 June 2012
Preceded by	Peter Strieder
Succeeded by	Jan Stöß
Deputy Governing Mayor of Berlin
In office 11 December 2011 – 14 December 2014
Governing Mayor	Klaus Wowereit
Preceded by	Ingeborg Junge-Reyer
Succeeded by	Dilek Kalayci
Senator for Urban Development and Environment of Berlin
In office 11 December 2011 – 14 December 2014
Governing Mayor	Klaus Wowereit
Preceded by	Ingeborg Junge-Reyer
Succeeded by	Andreas Geisel
Leader of the Social Democratic Party in the Abgeordnetenhaus of Berlin
In office 16 June 2001 – 1 December 2011
Preceded by	Klaus Wowereit
Succeeded by	Raed Saleh
Parliamentary constituencies
Member of the Bundestag; for Berlin-Charlottenburg-Wilmersdorf
In office 26 October 2021 – 25 March 2025
Preceded by	Klaus-Dieter Gröhler
Succeeded by	Lukas Krieger
Member of the Bundesrat for Berlin
In office 16 December 2014 – 26 October 2021
Preceded by	Klaus Wowereit
Succeeded by	Vacant
Member of the; Berlin House of Representatives
In office 2 February 1996 – 4 November 2021
Preceded by	Lore Maria Peschel-Gutzeit
Succeeded by	Aferdita Suka
Constituency	Tempelhof (1996–2001); Tempelhof-Schöneberg 4 (2001–2021)

Personal details
- Born: Rainer Michael Müller; 9 December 1964 (age 61) West Berlin, West Germany
- Party: Social Democratic (since 1981)
- Spouse: Claudia Müller (m. 1993; div. 2019)
- Children: 2

Rainer Michael Müller (born 9 December 1964) is a German politician of the Social Democratic Party (SPD) who served as Governing Mayor of Berlin from 2014 to 2021. He served as a member of the German Bundestag from 2021 to 2025, representing the Berlin-Charlottenburg-Wilmersdorf district.

He was also President of the Bundesrat from November 2017 until October 2018, which made him deputy to the President of Germany.

== Political career ==
=== State politics ===
Müller was elected to the Berlin House of Representatives in 1996 and has been a member ever since. On 16 June 2001, he took over leadership of the SPD Group in the House of Representatives from Klaus Wowereit who had been elected Governing Mayor of Berlin. After the resignation of Peter Strieder in April 2004, Müller ran for the Berlin SPD State Party Leadership and won, remaining the Leader of Berlin SPD until he lost his re-election bid against Jan Stöß in June 2012.

Following the 2011 state elections in Berlin, Müller was senator for urban development and the environment from 1 December 2011 to 11 December 2014. One of his most extensive projects, which planned to build business space and apartments on the grounds of the former Tempelhof Airport, was rejected in 2014 by a clear majority of Berlin citizens in a referendum.

=== Mayor of Berlin, 2014–2021 ===
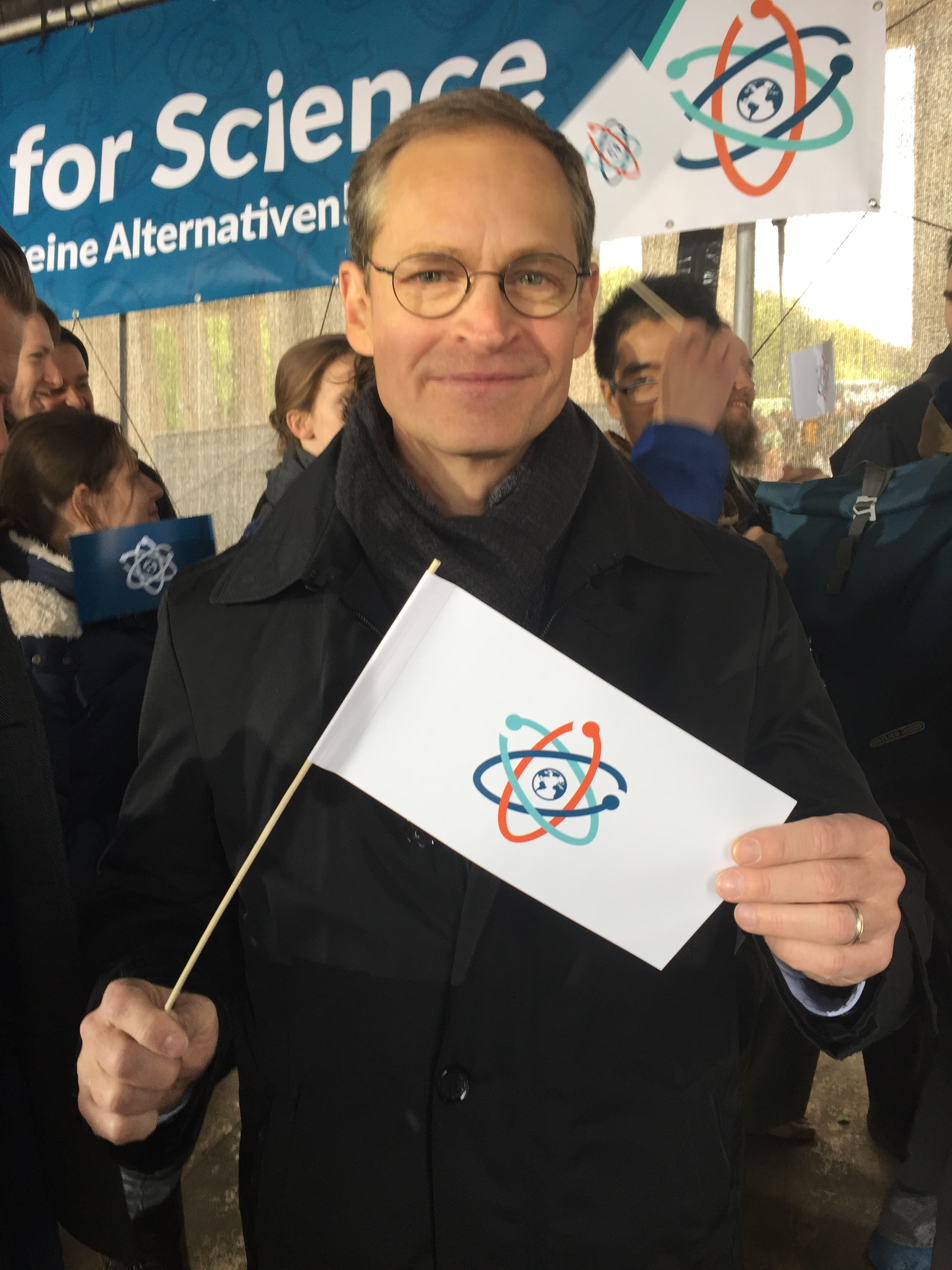
Müller at the 2017 March for Science in Berlin

In December 2014, Müller took over in midterm from the incumbent Klaus Wowereit, Berlin's longest-serving mayor since reunification in 1990, who presided over the city's emergence as a popular tourist destination and center for high-tech start-ups but stepped down after his popularity suffered from the debacle around the Berlin Brandenburg Airport.

Müller had previously made a surprise entry into the race to succeed Wowereit and defeated two candidates initially seen as the most likely successors. Shortly before the election, Müller ran for the Leadership of the Social Democratic Party in Berlin a second time, and won. In the 2016 Berlin Election, he led the party to victory, albeit not without some losses. After the election, Müller ended the grand coalition with the Christian Democratic Union and formed a new government with the Green Party and the left-wing Die Linke.

As one of the state's representatives at the Bundesrat, Müller served on the Committee on Foreign Affairs, the Committee on European Affairs and the Committee on Cultural Affairs from 2014.

Müller was an SPD delegate to the Federal Convention for the purpose of electing the President of Germany in 2004, 2009 and 2012. In the negotiations to form a coalition government under the leadership of Chancellor Angela Merkel following the 2017 federal elections, he was part of the working group on urban development, led by Bernd Althusmann, Kurt Gribl and Natascha Kohnen.

=== Member of the German Parliament, 2021–2025 ===
In August 2020, Müller announced his intention to leave state politics and instead run as a candidate in the 2021 national elections. In the negotiations to form a so-called traffic light coalition of the SPD, the Green Party and the Free Democrats (FDP) on the national level following the elections, he was part of his party's delegation in the working group on innovation and research, co-chaired by Thomas Losse-Müller, Katharina Fegebank and Lydia Hüskens.

In parliament, Müller served on the Committee on Foreign Affairs (2021–2025) and its Subcommittee on Foreign Cultural and Educational Policy (2022–2025). He also chaired a study commission set up to investigate the entire period of German involvement in Afghanistan from 2001 to 2021 and to draw lessons for foreign and security policy in future.

In addition to his committee assignments, Müller chaired the German-Japanese Parliamentary Friendship Group.

== Other activities ==
=== Corporate boards ===
- Flughafen Berlin Brandenburg GmbH, chairman of the supervisory board

=== Non-profit organizations ===
- Tarabya Cultural Academy, Member of the Advisory Board (since 2022)
- Friends of the Fraekelufer Synagogue, member of the board of trustees (since 2018)
- Business Forum of the Social Democratic Party of Germany, member of the political advisory board (since 2018)
- Ernst Reuter Foundation for Advanced Study, ex-officio chair of the board of trustees
- Free University of Berlin, member of the board of trustees
- Natural History Museum, Berlin, member of the board of trustees
- Technische Universität Berlin, member of the board of trustees (2018–2019)
- Stiftung Preußische Seehandlung, ex-officio chairman of the board of trustees (–2021)
- Topography of Terror Foundation, chairman
- Development and Peace Foundation (SEF), deputy chairman of the board of trustees
- Association of German Cities, ex-officio member of the Presidium
- American Academy in Berlin, honorary trustee
- Aspen Institute Berlin, member of the board of trustees
- Cultural Foundation of the German States (KdL), ex-officio member of the council
- Deutsche Klassenlotterie Berlin (DKB), member of the board of trustees (–2021)
- Deutsches Museum, member of the board of trustees (–2021)
- Council for Christian-Jewish Cooperation in Berlin, member of the board of trustees (–2021)
- Literarisches Colloquium Berlin, member of the board of trustees (–2021)
