= Governing Mayor of Berlin =

Head of government presiding over the Berlin Senate in Germany

- Regierender Bürgermeister von Berlin (German)
- Coat of arms of Berlin

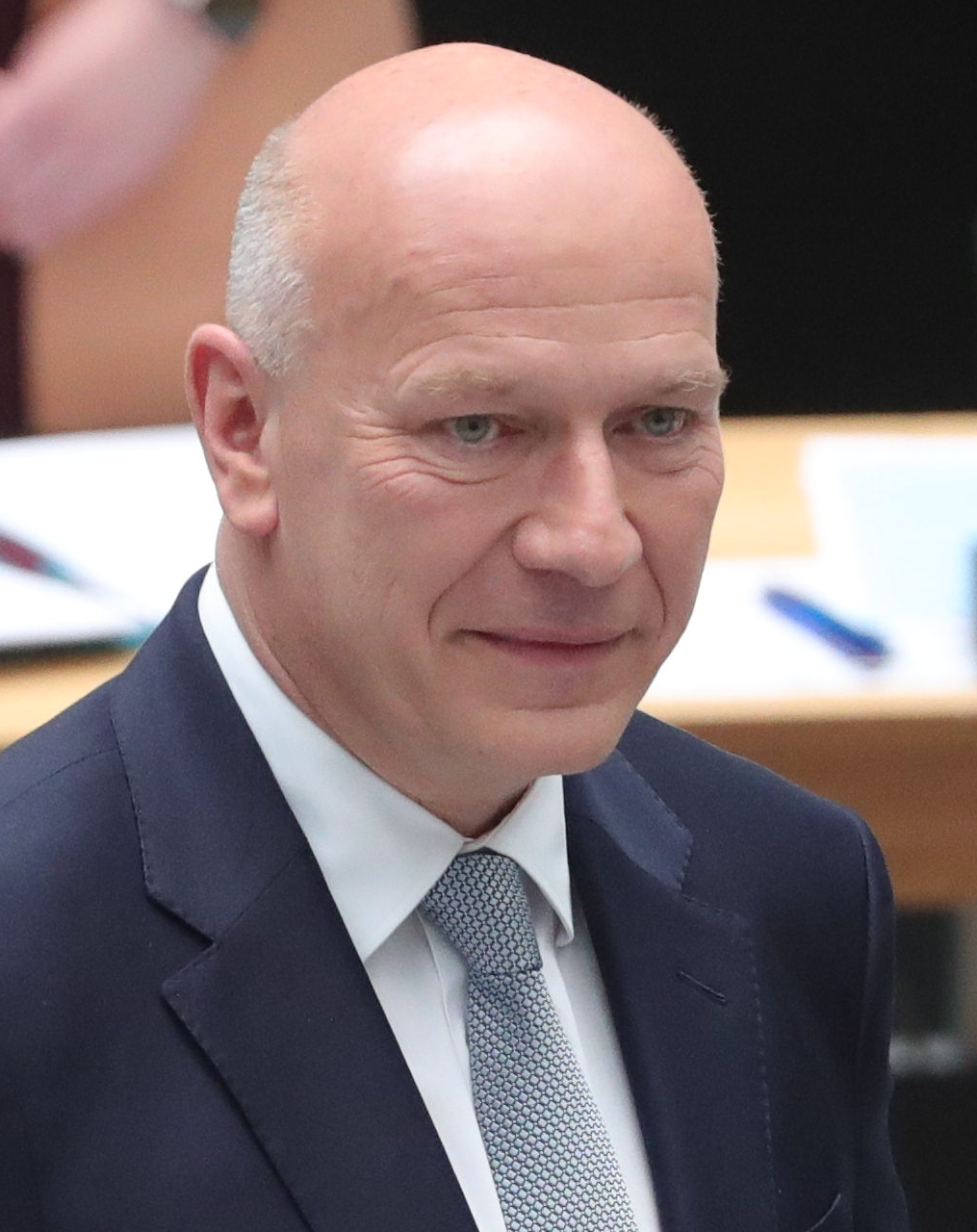
- Incumbent; Kai Wegner since 27 April 2023
- Type: Lord Mayor; Head of government
- Member of: Senate of Berlin
- Residence: Rotes Rathaus
- Appointer: Berlin House of Representatives
- Term length: Pending resignation or the election of a successor
- Constituting instrument: Constitution of Berlin
- Precursor: Lord Mayor of Greater Berlin
- Formation: 11 January 1951
- First holder: Ernst Reuter
- Website: berlin.de/rbmskzl

The Governing Mayor of Berlin (German: Regierender Bürgermeister von Berlin) is the mayor, head of state, and head of government of Berlin, presiding over the Berlin Senate. As Berlin is an independent city as well as one of the constituent states of Germany (Bundesländer), the office is the equivalent of the ministers-president of the other German states (except those of the other two city-states, Hamburg and Bremen, where the heads of government are called "First Mayor" and "President of the Senate and Mayor", respectively). The official title Governing Mayor was introduced in Berlin's 1948 constitution to distinguish the governing mayor from their two deputies, who are simply called "Mayor" (Bürgermeister) in German, as well as the borough mayors.

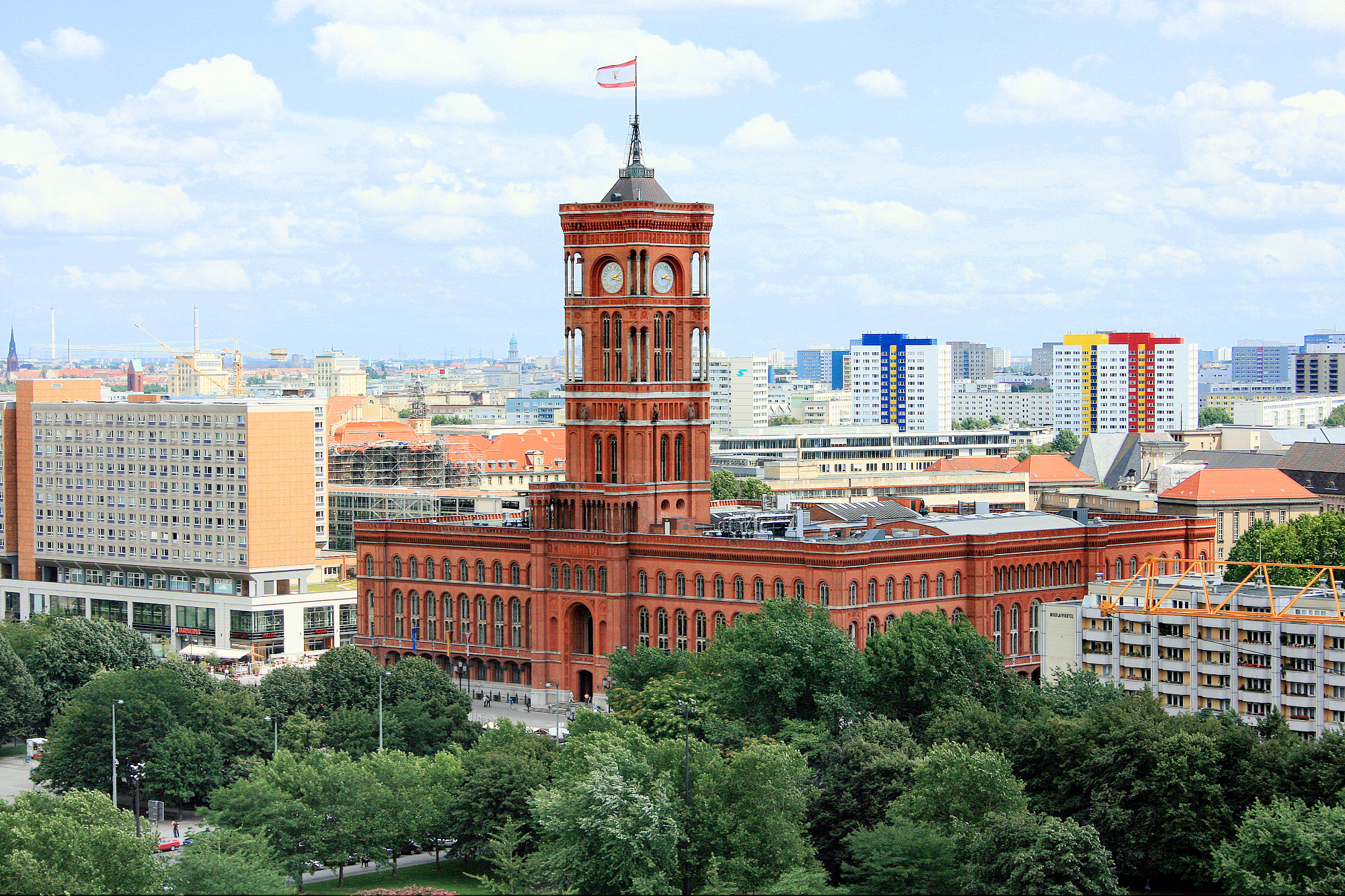
Seat of the governing mayor of Berlin, the Rotes Rathaus

According to the Berlin Constitution, the governing mayor is member and head of the executive branch, the Senate. The Senate consists of ten senators appointed by the governing mayor, with two of them designated as deputy governing mayors. The twelve boroughs of Berlin are also headed by borough mayors, although they do not actually preside over self-governmental municipalities.

The governing mayor of Berlin is elected by the city-state's legislature, the Berlin House of Representatives, which also controls policy guidelines and is able to force the governing mayor's resignation by a motion of no confidence. The governing mayor is empowered to appoint and dismiss the senators.

The seat of the Senate is the city hall, Rotes Rathaus, in the borough Mitte.

== History ==
As capital of the Kingdom of Prussia, Berlin received its first mayor (Oberbürgermeister) in accordance with the Prussian reforms approved by King Frederick William III after the retreat of the Napoleonic occupation troops in 1809. The mayor of Berlin was the head of the city council, called the Magistrat. The two-stage administration and the office of the borough mayors were implemented in the course of the wide-ranging incorporations under the 1920 Greater Berlin Act.

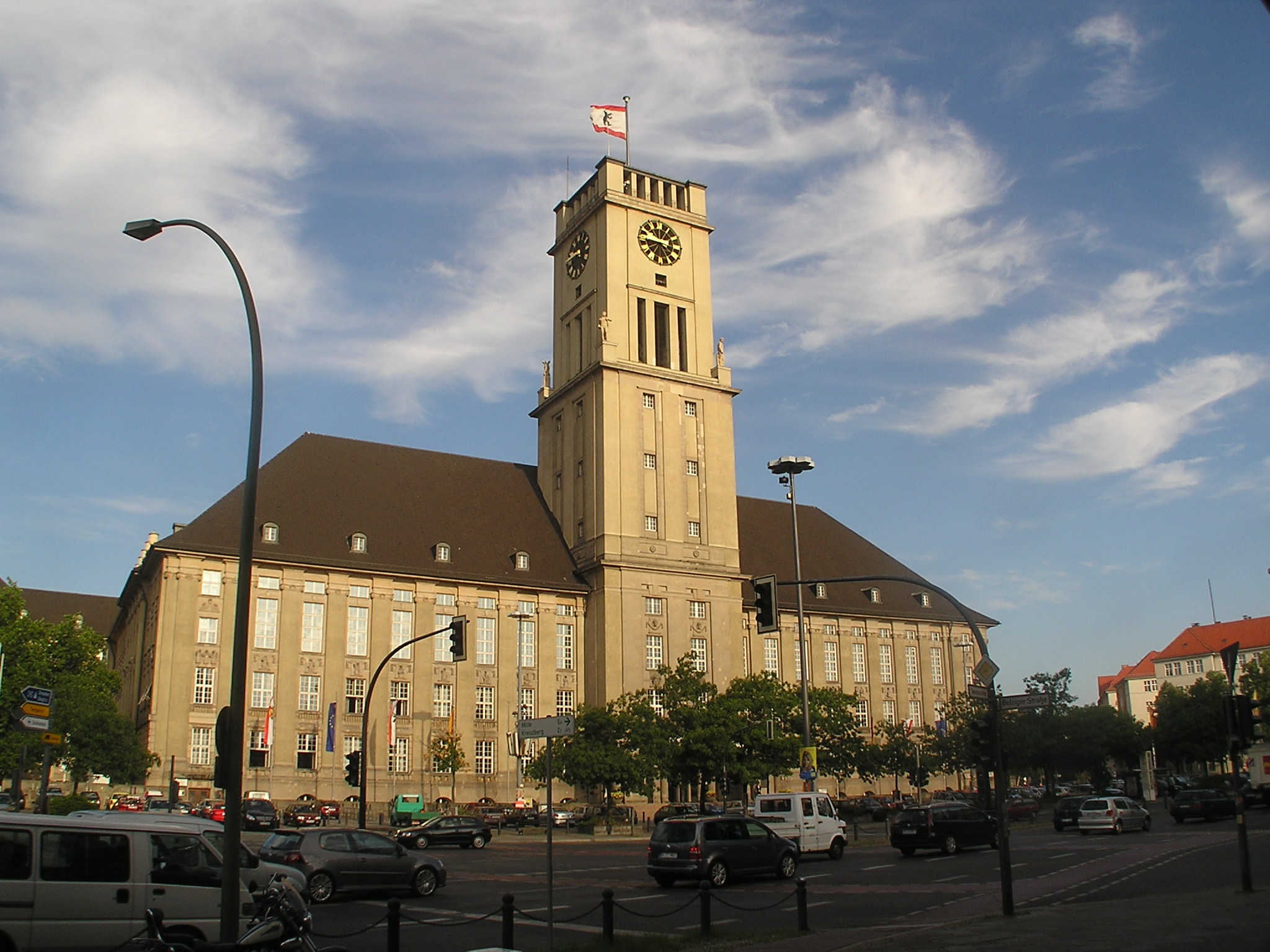
Rathaus Schöneberg, the borough hall of Schöneberg, was the city hall and seat of the mayor of West Berlin during the Division of Germany.

During the Allied occupation after World War II, the city assembly (Stadtverordnetenversammlung) elected the Social Democratic politician Ernst Reuter as mayor on 24 June 1947, who, however, was not confirmed by the Allied Kommandatura of Berlin due to Soviet reservations. After the Communist putsch in Berlin's city government in September 1948, a separate city parliament (still named Stadtverordnetenversammlung von Groß-Berlin), de facto only competent for the Western occupation sectors (which would become West Berlin), was elected on 5 December 1948, and two days later a separate city government was elected with Ernst Reuter as governing mayor of West Berlin. The Soviet administration had officially deposed the previous elected government of all of Berlin – effectively, only in the eastern sector — and had installed the SED mayor Friedrich Ebert, Jr., in East Berlin on 30 November 1948.

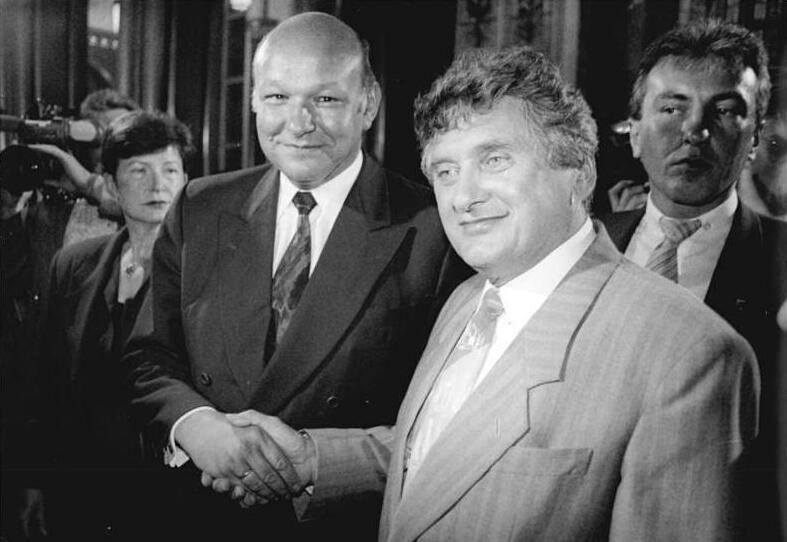
West Berlin Governing Mayor Walter Momper (l.) and East Berlin Mayor Tino Schwierzina, May 1990

West Berlin introduced its own constitution (Verfassung von Berlin), accounting for the changed facts, as of 1 October 1950. This constitution provided renamed the city's parliament "House of Representatives of Berlin", the city's executive government "Senate of Berlin", and the head of government "Governing Mayor of Berlin" (Regierender Bürgermeister von Berlin). Under the new constitution, representatives were elected on 3 December 1950, and the new parliament re-elected Ernst Reuter governing mayor on 18 January 1951. From 1951 to 1990, during the Cold War, the governing mayor was the head of government in West Berlin with his seat at Rathaus Schöneberg, while East Berlin de jure remained under Soviet occupation and de facto became a part, and the capital, of East Germany — a status not recognized by NATO members, but condoned by the 1971 Four Power Agreement on Berlin and the German Basic Treaty of 1972.

The government of West Berlin claimed to be the legitimate government of all of Berlin within the borders established by the 1920 Greater Berlin Act until the Peaceful Revolution of 1989. In 1990, even before German reunification on 3 October 1990, the mayors of West Berlin and East Berlin held common cabinet meetings, until Berlin-wide elections took place on 2 December 1990.

== List ==
Portrait	Name (Birth–Death)	Term of office			Political party	Senate
Portrait	Name (Birth–Death)	Took office	Left office	Time in office	Political party	Senate
1	Ernst Reuter (1889–1953)	7 December 1948	29 September 1953 died in office	4 years, 296 days	SPD	I
2	Walther Schreiber (1884–1958)	29 September 1953	11 January 1955	1 year, 104 days	CDU	I
3	Otto Suhr (1894–1957)	11 January 1955	30 August 1957 died in office	2 years, 231 days	SPD	I
Mayor Franz Amrehn (CDU) served as acting Governing Mayor 30 August to 3 October 1957.
4	Willy Brandt (1913–1992)	3 October 1957	1 December 1966 resigned	9 years, 59 days	SPD	I II III
5	Heinrich Albertz (1915–1993)	1 December 1966	19 October 1967 resigned	322 days	SPD	I II
6	Klaus Schütz (1926–2012)	19 October 1967	2 May 1977 resigned	9 years, 195 days	SPD	I II III
7	Dietrich Stobbe (1938–2011)	2 May 1977	23 January 1981 resigned	3 years, 266 days	SPD	I II
8	Hans-Jochen Vogel (1926–2020)	23 January 1981	11 June 1981	139 days	SPD	I
9	Richard von Weizsäcker (1920–2015)	11 June 1981	9 February 1984 resigned	2 years, 243 days	CDU	I
10	Eberhard Diepgen (born 1941); 1st term	9 February 1984	24 January 1991	5 years, 35 days	CDU	I II
11	Walter Momper (Note: Walter Momper was the last Governing Mayor of West Berlin before reunification. Due to the German Reunification Treaty, from 3 October 1990 on, he and the Lord Mayor of East Berlin were equal, collegial heads of state government for a transitional period until the formation of a new state government after the first state election in reunified Berlin. The Lord Mayors of East Berlin during this period were Tino Schwierzina (SPD, 3 October 1990–11 January 1991) and Thomas Krüger (acting, SPD, 11–24 January 1991). Since the unification of the previously divided city of Berlin in 1990 was, in terms of constitutional law, an accession of East Berlin to the area of application of the West Berlin state constitution, there is a formal continuity of the Governing mayors of (West) Berlin before and after 1990/91, while the office of Lord Mayor of East Berlin was separate from it and ceased to exist in 1991.) (born 1945)	16 March 1989	3 October 1990	1 year, 314 days	SPD	I
12	Eberhard Diepgen (born 1941); 2nd term	24 January 1991	16 June 2001 voted out of office by a vote of no confidence	10 years, 143 days	CDU	III IV V
13	Klaus Wowereit (born 1953)	16 June 2001	11 December 2014 resigned	13 years, 178 days	SPD	I II III IV
14	Michael Müller (born 1964)	11 December 2014	21 December 2021	7 years, 10 days	SPD	I II
15	Franziska Giffey (born 1978)	21 December 2021	27 April 2023	1 year, 127 days	SPD	I
16	Kai Wegner (born 1972)	27 April 2023	Incumbent	3 years, 179 days	CDU	I

== See also ==
- Politics of Berlin
- History of Berlin
- Timeline of Berlin
- List of people from Berlin
- List of mayors of Berlin
