= Klaus Wowereit =

German politician (born 1953)

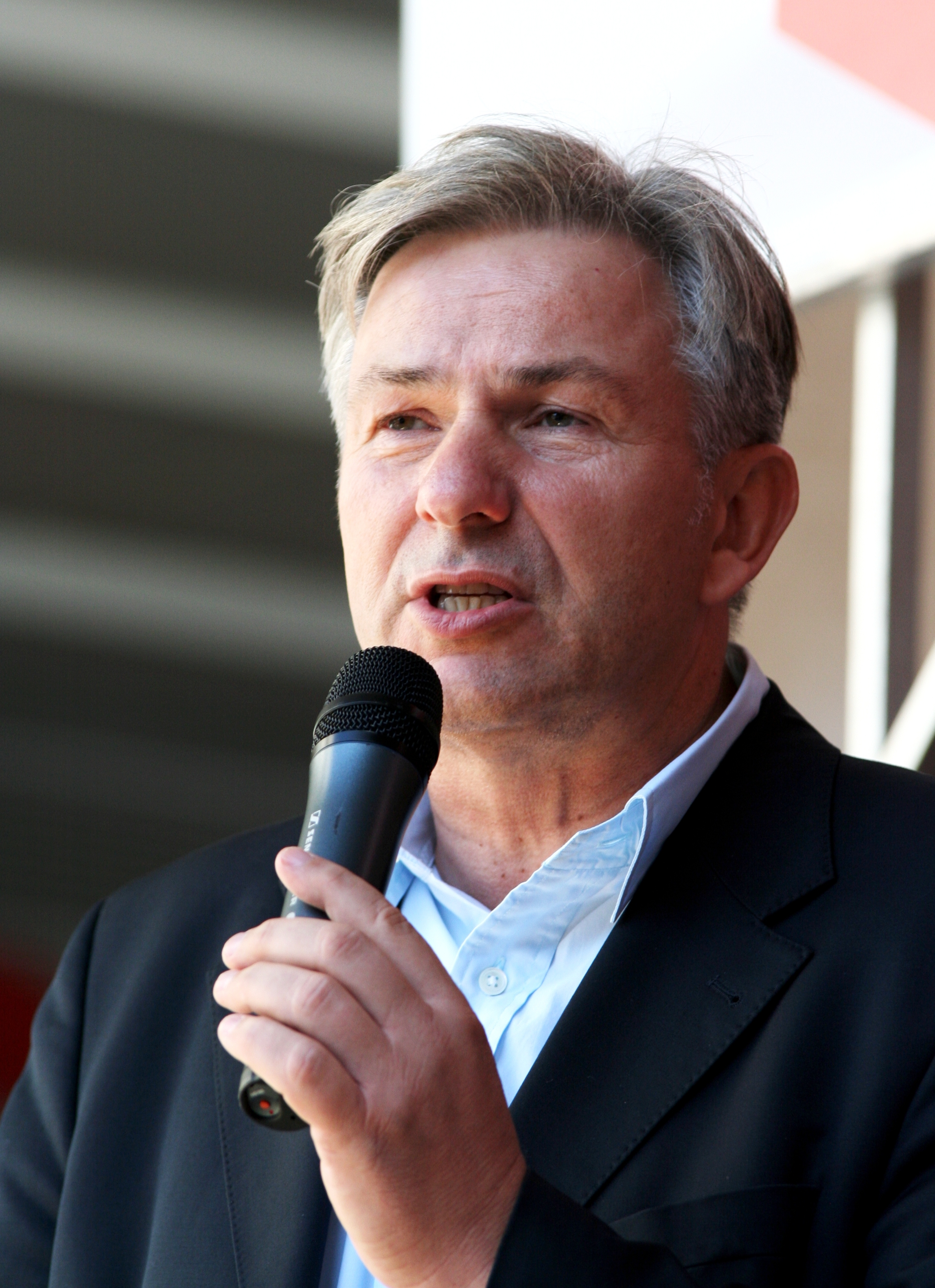
- Wowereit in 2009

Governing Mayor of Berlin
- In office 16 June 2001 – 11 December 2014
- Mayor: Wolfgang Wieland; Klaus Böger; Gregor Gysi; Karin Schubert; Harald Wolf; Ingeborg Junge-Reyer; Frank Henkel; Michael Müller
- Preceded by: Eberhard Diepgen
- Succeeded by: Michael Müller

President of the Bundesrat
- In office 1 November 2001 – 31 October 2002
- First Vice President: Kurt Beck
- Preceded by: Kurt Beck
- Succeeded by: Wolfgang Böhmer

Deputy Leader of the Social Democratic Party
- In office 12 November 2009 – 14 November 2013 Serving with Hannelore Kraft, Manuela Schwesig, Olaf Scholz
- Leader: Sigmar Gabriel
- Preceded by: Andrea Nahles
- Succeeded by: Ralf Stegner

Leader of the Social Democratic Party in the Abgeordnetenhaus of Berlin
- In office 10 October 1999 – 16 June 2001
- Deputy: Hermann Borghorst; Kirsten Flesch; Christian Gaebler; Irana Rusta
- Preceded by: Klaus Böger
- Succeeded by: Michael Müller
Parliamentary constituencies
Member of the Abgeordnetenhaus of Berlin
In office 26 October 2006 – 27 October 2011
Preceded by	Peter Kurth
Succeeded by	Claudio Jupe
Constituency	Charlottenburg-Wilmersdorf 5
In office 30 November 1995 – 26 October 2006
Preceded by	multi-member district
Succeeded by	multi-member district
Constituency	Tempelhof-Schöneberg

Personal details
- Born: 1 October 1953 (age 73) Tempelhof, West Berlin, West Germany (now Germany)
- Party: Social Democratic Party of Germany (1972–)
- Domestic partner: Jörn Kubicki (1993–2020)
- Education: Free University of Berlin
- Occupation: Politician; Jurist; Civil Servant
- Website: Official Website

Klaus Wowereit (born 1 October 1953) is a German politician of the Social Democratic Party (SPD) and was the Governing Mayor of Berlin from 21 October 2001 to 11 December 2014. In 2001 state elections his party won a plurality of the votes, 29.7%. He served as President of the Bundesrat (the fourth highest office in Germany) in 2001/02. His SPD-led coalition was re-elected in the 2006 elections; after the 2011 elections the SPD's coalition partner changed from the Left to the Christian Democratic Union. He was also sometimes mentioned as a possible SPD candidate for the Chancellorship of Germany (Kanzlerkandidatur), but that never materialized.

== Early life ==
Wowereit was born in West Berlin. Until 1973, Wowereit attended the Ulrich-von-Hutten-Oberschule in Berlin-Lichtenrade. Afterwards, he studied law at the Free University Berlin (State Exams, 1981 and 1984).

== Political career ==
After three years as a civil servant in the Senate office of the Interior, Wowereit stood for election as municipal councillor in the Tempelhof district. At the age of 30, he was, therefore, the youngest councilor in the city of Berlin. After eleven years as a District Councillor he stood for the Berlin House of Representatives (Abgeordnetenhaus von Berlin) which serves as the City's State Parliament in 1995. In December 1999, he was elected chairman of the SPD parliamentary group in the Abgeordnetenhaus.

=== Mayor of Berlin, 2001–2014 ===
Wowereit took office as Governing Mayor of Berlin (Regierender Bürgermeister) in June 2001. Previously, the SPD had left the grand coalition with the CDU and initiated new elections. After this election and following long-time negotiations, Wowereit finally started a coalition with the PDS.

In 2003, Wowereit declared that "Berlin ist arm, aber sexy" ("Berlin is poor, but sexy"), a description that reflected on the one hand the city's working class history and on-going financial woes, and on the other its cultural vibrancy, aided by a relatively low cost of living for a major European capital. The phrase helped to market the city to the rest of the world, and it drew in tourists, as well as attracting artists, writers, musicians and subsequently technology entrepreneurs. However, concern about gentrification and increasingly expensive rents is often expressed by seasoned Berliners and new-comers alike.

In the elections held on 17 September 2006, Wowereit's SPD finished as the strongest party with a plurality of 30.8%. A coalition with Die Linke was continued. However the 16th Abgeordnetenhaus re-elected Wowereit as Governing Mayor on 23 November 2006, in the second ballot with only a 75:74 majority. CDU, Free Democrats and the Green Party voted against him. In the elections held on 18 September 2011 he and his party were again the strongest party.

Public attitude in Germany on the topic of migration has a long history of controversy. A regular German poll by the opinion polling agency Ipsos indicates that the number of immigrants in Germany, as well as the proportion of Muslim immigrants among Germany's migrant population is vastly overestimated by those polled, so too in 2019. Recent statistics of the German Buro of Statistics reported 21.9 million people with a "migration background" (citizens and non-citizens) in Germany, 2020. Of those, in the same year, according to the statistics agency Statista, 5.5 million were Muslim. The publication of former Berlin state Minister of Finance Thilo Sarrazin's 2010 polemic Germany Abolishes Itself fell in Klaus Wowereit's tenure as governing mayor of Berlin. This prompted heated debates throughout the German-speaking countries. In response, in 2011, Mayor Wowereit published Mut zur Integration – für ein neues Miteinander ("Courage for integration – for a new together"). That same year, he appointed Turkish-origin politician Dilek Kolat Senator for Labour, Integration and Women. In May 2012, Wowereit named Şermin Langhoff artistic director of the Maxim Gorki Theater.

In the negotiations to form a Grand Coalition of Chancellor Angela Merkel's Christian Democrats (CDU together with the Bavarian CSU) and the SPD following the 2013 federal elections, Wowereit led the SPD delegation in the working group on cultural and media affairs; his counterpart of the CDU was Michael Kretschmer.

On 26 August 2014 Wowereit announced that he would resign his position as of 11 December 2014. At the time of his resignation, he was the longest-serving head of a German state.

==== Resignation and Berlin-Brandenburg Airport debacle ====
On 21 October 2003 Wowereit became one of four members representing the Land of Berlin in the supervisory board of the project to build the new Berlin Brandenburg Airport. In 2006, he was elected chairman of the board. However, on 7 January 2013, Wowereit relinquished his chairmanship after the continuing delay of the airport's opening date. The prime minister of the Land of Brandenburg, Matthias Platzeck was appointed as his successor. Wowereit survived a vote of no confidence brought against him in the Berlin House of Representatives on 12 January. When Platzeck gave up his political offices for health reasons in July 2013, Wowereit was eventually appointed chairman again, despite much criticism. Critics have accused Wowereit of being responsible for the various delays and cost overruns of the airport project. He has been accused of being blind to looming problems, and reacting angrily to unfavorable reports. Also, he is said to have filled the board with political friends rather than professionals.

Wowereit announced his intention to resign at the end of 2014 due to the airport delays saying it was the "biggest failure" of his term in office, but that there were also other "several difficult times here."

== Life after politics ==
Alongside Jutta Allmendinger, Wowereit co-chaired an independent expert commission on gender-based discrimination at Germany's Federal Anti-Discrimination Agency from 2015 until 2016. In 2017, he briefly arbitrated wage negotiations between Eurowings and UFO, a flight attendant trade union.

== Other activities (selection) ==
=== Corporate boards ===
- Berlin Schönefeld Airport, Ex-Officio Chairman of the Supervisory Board

=== Non-profit organizations ===
- Friedrich Ebert Foundation (FES), Member
- Berlin Central and Regional Library (ZLB), Ex-Officio Chairman of the Board of Trustees
- 2011 European Artistic Gymnastics Championships, Ex-Officio Chairman of the Board of Trustees
- Development and Peace Foundation (SEF), Deputy Chairman of the Board of Trustees

== Personal life ==
Wowereit is the youngest child in his family, with two other brothers and two sisters, who grew up without a father. One of his brothers supported his studies and later he took care of his brother, who was paralyzed after an accident, as well as his mother, who was suffering from cancer.

Wowereit is one of the most famous German politicians who is openly gay. In coming out, prior to the 2001 mayoral elections, he coined the now famous German phrase "Ich bin schwul, und das ist auch gut so." ("I'm gay, and that's a good thing.") In his autobiography, Wowereit states that his decision to come out in public was made because after his nomination as candidate to become the Mayor of Berlin, he felt that the German tabloids were already "on the right track". With his coming out, Wowereit wanted to beat the tabloids to it and prevent them from writing wild, sensational and fabricated stories about his private life. Wowereit said those now famous words during a convention of the Berlin SPD. After the end of his speech, there was half a second of surprised silence, then spontaneous cheering and loud applause to support him.

In a 2010 interview with Time magazine, he said that coming out may actually have strengthened his campaign.

His election as mayor made Berlin one of three major European cities with an openly gay mayor, along with Paris, whose mayor was Bertrand Delanoë, and Hamburg, whose mayor was Ole von Beust at that time, who both also took office in 2001. However, von Beust resigned in 2010 and Delanoë left office in 2014, making Wowereit the only gay mayor of a major European city or of a major German city. Berlin being the largest and Hamburg being the second largest city in Germany, they are also German states in their own right, having made both Wowereit and von Beust also state premiers.

In September 2007, Wowereit published an autobiographical book titled "…und das ist auch gut so.", after his famous coming-out phrase (ISBN 3896673343).

Wowereit's civil partner, Jörn Kubicki, was a neurosurgeon. They were in a relationship from 1993 to March 2020 when Kubicki died as a result of a COVID-19 infection.

== Awards ==
- 2001: Ix-Xirka Ġieħ ir-Repubblika
- 2004: Honorary member Reichsbanners Schwarz-Rot-Gold, Bund aktiver Demokraten e.V.
- 2011: Großes Verdienstkreuz mit Stern und Schulterband of Germany

== See also ==
- List of LGBT heads of government
- Timeline of Berlin, 2000s–2010s
- List of people from Berlin

Political offices
Preceded by Eberhard Diepgen	Governing Mayor of Berlin; 2001–2014	Succeeded by Michael Müller
