= Berlin-Reinickendorf (electoral district) =

Federal electoral district of Germany

76 Berlin-Reinickendorf
- Electoral district for the Bundestag
- Berlin-Reinickendorf in 2025
- State: Berlin
- Population: 260,200 (2019)
- Electorate: 176,585 (2021)
- Area: 89.3 km^{2}

Current electoral district
- Created: 1990
- Party: CDU
- Member: Marvin Schulz
- Elected: 2025

Berlin-Reinickendorf is an electoral constituency (German: Wahlkreis) represented in the Bundestag. It elects one member via first-past-the-post voting. Under the current constituency numbering system, it is designated as constituency 76. It is located in northern Berlin, comprising the Reinickendorf borough.

Berlin-Reinickendorf was created for the inaugural 1990 federal election after German reunification. Since 2025, it has been represented by Marvin Schulz of the Christian Democratic Union (CDU).

== Geography ==
Berlin-Reinickendorf is located in northern Berlin. As of the 2021 federal election, it is coterminous with the Reinickendorf borough.

== History ==
Berlin-Reinickendorf was created after German reunification in 1990. In the 1990 election, it was constituency 250 in the numbering system. In the 1994 and 1998 elections, it was number 251. In the 2002 through 2009 elections, it was number 78. In the 2013 through 2021 elections, it was number 77. From the 2025 election, it has been number 76. Its borders have not changed since its creation.

== Members ==
The constituency was first represented by Gabriele Wiechatzek of the Christian Democratic Union (CDU) from 1990 to 1994, followed by Diethard Schütze from 1994 to 1998. It was won by the Social Democratic Party (SPD) in 1998 and represented by Detlef Dzembritzki until 2009. Frank Steffel of the CDU was elected in 2009, and re-elected in 2013 and 2017. He was succeeded by Monika Grütters in 2021, who was in turn succeeded by Marvin Schulz in 2025.

Election	Member	Party	%
1990	Gabriele Wiechatzek	CDU	54.4
1994	Diethard Schütze	CDU	47.4
1998	Detlef Dzembritzki	SPD	47.7
2002	Detlef Dzembritzki	SPD	42.5
2005	Detlef Dzembritzki	SPD	42.5
2009	Frank Steffel	CDU	39.0
2013	Frank Steffel	CDU	45.0
2017	Frank Steffel	CDU	36.8
2021	Monika Grütters	CDU	27.2
2025	Marvin Schulz	CDU	30.9

== Election results ==
=== 2025 election ===
Federal election (2025): Berlin-Reinickendorf
Notes:	Blue background denotes the winner of the electorate vote. Pink background denotes a candidate elected from their party list. Yellow background denotes an electorate win by a list member, or other incumbent. A ✓ or ✗ denotes status of any incumbent, win or lose respectively.						
Party	Candidate	Votes	%	±%	Party votes	%	±%
CDU	Marvin Schulz	40,867	30.9	▲1.4	35,169	26.4	0.0
SPD	Julian Holter	28,956	21.9	▼2.2	22,997	17.3	▼5.7
AfD	Sebastian Maack	23,866	18.0	▲6.8	23,124	17.4	▲6.0
Greens	Klara Schedlich	17,136	12.9	▼0.9	17,074	12.8	▼2.8
Left	Katina Schubert	15,584	11.8	▲7.1	15,729	11.8	▲7.3
BSW					7,083	5.3	New
FDP	Marius Strubenhoff	4,737	3.6	▼3.9	5,986	4.5	▼4.7
Tierschutzpartei					2,538	1.9	▼1.0
Volt					1,013	0.8	▲0.4
PARTEI					743	0.6	▼0.6
FW					455	0.3	▼1.1
Team Todenhöfer					421	0.3	▼0.8
BD	Martin Braband	1,204	0.9	New	270	0.2	New
PdF					247	0.2	New
MERA25					112	0.1	New
BüSo					40	0.1	0.0
MLPD					40	0.1	0.0
SGP					29	0.1	0.0
Informal votes		1,776			1,056		
Total valid votes		132,350			133,070		
Turnout		134,126	77.8	▲12.7			
CDU hold	Majority	11,911	9.0	▲6.6			

=== 2021 election ===
Federal election (2021): Berlin-Reinickendorf
Notes:	Blue background denotes the winner of the electorate vote. Pink background denotes a candidate elected from their party list. Yellow background denotes an electorate win by a list member, or other incumbent. A ✓ or ✗ denotes status of any incumbent, win or lose respectively.						
Party	Candidate	Votes	%	±%	Party votes	%	±%
CDU	Monika Grütters	34,233	27.2	▼9.6	30,272	24.0	▼7.0
SPD	Torsten Einstmann	32,445	25.8	▲2.2	31,447	25.0	▲4.9
Greens	Bernd Schwarz	17,621	14.0	▲6.1	19,581	15.6	▲6.4
AfD	Sebastian Maack	12,249	9.8	▼3.4	12,296	9.8	▼3.9
FDP	Friedrich Ohnesorge	10,927	8.7	▲1.5	13,457	10.7	▼0.7
Left	Hakan Taş	6,107	4.9	▼2.8	5,843	4.6	▼3.9
Tierschutzpartei	Friederike Nabrdalik	3,843	3.1		3,675	2.9	▲1.5
FW	Dirk Steffel	2,601	2.1		1,899	1.5	▲1.3
Die Grauen	Michael Schulz	2,368	1.9	▲0.7	2,152	1.7	▲0.7
Team Todenhöfer					1,670	1.3	
PARTEI	Pauline Klimas	1,782	1.4	▼0.7	1,497	1.2	▼0.2
dieBasis	Manfred Salzmann	1,169	0.9				
Volt					522	0.4	
Pirates					390	0.3	▼0.2
Gesundheitsforschung					312	0.2	▲0.1
Humanists					218	0.2	
ÖDP	Andreas Neumann	281	0.2		160	0.1	0.0
NPD					132	0.1	
du.					107	0.1	0.0
V-Partei3					81	0.1	0.0
LKR					59	0.0	
DKP					48	0.0	0.0
MLPD					29	0.0	0.0
BüSo					26	0.0	▼0.1
SGP					26	0.0	0.0
Informal votes		2,951			2,678		
Total valid votes		125,626			125,899		
Turnout		128,577	72.8	▼2.4			
CDU hold	Majority	1,788	1.4	▼11.8			

=== 2017 election ===
Federal election (2017): Berlin-Reinickendorf
Notes:	Blue background denotes the winner of the electorate vote. Pink background denotes a candidate elected from their party list. Yellow background denotes an electorate win by a list member, or other incumbent. A ✓ or ✗ denotes status of any incumbent, win or lose respectively.						
Party	Candidate	Votes	%	±%	Party votes	%	±%
CDU	✓ Frank Steffel	49,654	36.8	▼8.1	41,912	31.0	▼9.1
SPD	Thorsten Karge	31,882	23.6	▼5.8	27,071	20.0	▼6.3
AfD	Dieter Neuendorf	17,738	13.2	▲8.7	18,513	13.7	▲7.7
Greens	Stefanie Remlinger	10,647	7.9	▲1.2	12,305	9.1	▲0.4
Left	Hakan Taș	10,384	7.7	▲1.2	11,516	8.5	▲0.6
FDP	Juliane Hüttl	9,688	7.2	▲5.2	15,376	11.4	▲7.0
PARTEI	Bastian Badran	2,828	2.1	▲1.4	1,943	1.4	▲0.6
Tierschutzpartei					1,938	1.4	
Die Grauen	Michael Schulz	1,639	1.2		1,362	1.0	
Pirates					682	0.5	▼2.1
BGE					319	0.2	
DM					306	0.2	
FW					298	0.2	▼0.3
DiB					279	0.2	
Gesundheitsforschung					247	0.2	
ÖDP					231	0.2	0.0
Menschliche Welt					203	0.2	
du.					165	0.1	
V-Partei³					135	0.1	
BüSo	Matthias Woelki	400	0.3		114	0.1	0.0
MLPD					83	0.1	0.0
DKP					44	0.0	
SGP					32	0.0	0.0
B*					31	0.0	
Informal votes		2,380			2,135		
Total valid votes		134,860			135,105		
Turnout		137,240	75.2	▲2.3			
CDU hold	Majority	17,772	13.2	▼2.3			

=== 2013 election ===
Federal election (2013): Berlin-Reinickendorf
Notes:	Blue background denotes the winner of the electorate vote. Pink background denotes a candidate elected from their party list. Yellow background denotes an electorate win by a list member, or other incumbent. A ✓ or ✗ denotes status of any incumbent, win or lose respectively.						
Party	Candidate	Votes	%	±%	Party votes	%	±%
CDU	✓ Frank Steffel	58,845	45.0	▲5.9	52,545	40.1	▲7.2
SPD	Jörg Stroedter	38,593	29.5	▲2.0	34,571	26.4	▲4.9
Greens	Holger Lütge	8,790	6.7	▼4.0	11,427	8.7	▼4.8
Left	Hakan Taş	8,508	6.5	▼1.6	10,394	7.9	▼1.4
AfD	Ralf-Günther Conradi	5,852	4.5		7,906	6.0	
Pirates	Gerd Lindenblatt	3,251	2.5		3,417	2.6	▲0.3
FDP	Mieke Senftleben	2,605	2.0	▼8.6	5,708	4.4	▼11.5
NPD	André Markau	2,254	1.7	▼0.3	1,976	1.5	▼0.1
PARTEI	Feline Kuck	865	0.7		1,074	0.8	
Independent	Frank Ditsche	694	0.5				
FW	Detlef Dorn	624	0.5		661	0.5	
PRO					449	0.3	
REP					310	0.2	▼0.4
ÖDP					240	0.2	0.0
BIG					209	0.2	
BüSo					75	0.1	▼0.2
PSG					50	0.0	0.0
MLPD					44	0.0	0.0
Informal votes		2,603			2,428		
Total valid votes		130,881			131,056		
Turnout		133,484	73.0	▲0.6			
CDU hold	Majority	20,252	15.5	▲3.8			

=== 2009 election ===
Federal election (2009): Berlin-Reinickendorf
Notes:	Blue background denotes the winner of the electorate vote. Pink background denotes a candidate elected from their party list. Yellow background denotes an electorate win by a list member, or other incumbent. A ✓ or ✗ denotes status of any incumbent, win or lose respectively.						
Party	Candidate	Votes	%	±%	Party votes	%	±%
CDU	Frank Steffel	50,554	39.0	▲1.3	42,771	32.9	▲0.2
SPD	Jörg Stroedter	35,540	27.4	▼15.1	27,842	21.4	▼12.0
Greens	Anke Petters	13,875	10.7	▲5.3	17,577	13.5	▲3.3
FDP	Mieke Senftleben	13,711	10.6	▲5.1	20,580	15.8	▲5.1
Left	Felix Lederle	10,525	8.1	▲3.3	12,060	9.3	▲3.1
Pirates					2,979	2.3	
NPD	André Markau	2,613	2.0	▲0.8	2,074	1.6	▲0.4
Tierschutzpartei					1,946	1.5	
Independent	Frank Holger Kurt Ditsche	1,267	1.0				
REP					772	0.6	▼0.4
Independent	Dennis Hempel	529	0.4				
BüSo	Frank Scholz	879	0.7	▲0.3	372	0.3	▲0.1
DIE VIOLETTEN					340	0.3	
ÖDP					246	0.2	
DVU					165	0.1	
PSG					76	0.1	0.0
DKP					36	0.1	
MLPD					30	0.1	0.0
Informal votes		3,039			2,666		
Total valid votes		129,493			129,866		
Turnout		132,532	72.4	▼6.7			
CDU gain from SPD	Majority	15,014	11.6				

=== 2005 election ===
Federal election (2005):Berlin-Reinickendorf
Notes:	Blue background denotes the winner of the electorate vote. Pink background denotes a candidate elected from their party list. Yellow background denotes an electorate win by a list member, or other incumbent. A ✓ or ✗ denotes status of any incumbent, win or lose respectively.						
Party	Candidate	Votes	%	±%	Party votes	%	±%
SPD	✓ Detlef Dzembritzki	61,133	42.5	▲0.1	48,283	33.4	▼1.6
CDU	Frank Steffel	54,262	37.7	▼4.3	47,223	32.7	▼5.4
FDP	Mieke Senftleben	7,841	5.5	▼0.4	15,541	10.8	▲2.3
Greens	Oliver Schruoffeneger	7,821	5.4	▼0.6	14,795	10.2	▼0.7
Left	Andreas Wehr	6,883	4.8	▲2.9	8,902	6.2	▲4.2
GRAUEN					4,804	3.3	▲2.3
NPD	Andre Markau	1,805	1.3		1,800	1.2	▲0.8
REP	Tibor Haraszti	1,516	1.1		1,414	1.0	▲0.2
Independent	Frank Ditsche	1,262	0.9				
Independent	Marc-Stephan Garbe	663	0.5				
Feminist					607	0.4	0.0
BüSo	Rosa Tennenbaum	567	0.4		225	0.2	▲0.1
PARTEI					518	0.4	
APPD					123	0.1	
SGP					104	0.1	
MLPD					35	0.0	
Informal votes		3,294			2,673		
Total valid votes		143,753			144,374		
Turnout		147,047	79.1	▼1.2			
SPD hold	Majority	6,871	4.8				
