= Berlin-Marzahn – Hellersdorf =

Federal electoral district of Germany

84 Berlin-Marzahn-Hellersdorf
- Electoral district for the Bundestag
- Berlin-Marzahn-Hellersdorf in 2025
- State: Berlin
- Population: 270,200 (2019)
- Electorate: 197,988 (2021)
- Area: 61.8 km^{2}

Current electoral district
- Created: 1990
- Party: AfD
- Member: Gottfried Curio
- Elected: 2025

Berlin-Marzahn-Hellersdorf is an electoral constituency (German: Wahlkreis) represented in the Bundestag. It elects one member via first-past-the-post voting. Under the current constituency numbering system, it is designated as constituency 84. It is located in eastern Berlin, comprising the Marzahn-Hellersdorf borough.

Berlin-Marzahn-Hellersdorf was created for the inaugural 1990 federal election after German reunification. Since 2025, it has been represented by Gottfried Curio of Alternative for Germany (AfD).

== Geography ==
Berlin-Marzahn-Hellersdorf is located in eastern Berlin. As of the 2021 federal election, it is coterminous with the Marzahn-Hellersdorf borough.

== History ==
Berlin-Marzahn-Hellersdorf was created after German reunification in 1990. Until 2002, it was named Berlin-Hellersdorf-Marzahn. In the 1990 election, it was constituency 261 in the numbering system. In the 1994 and 1998 elections, it was number 260. In the 2002 through 2009 elections, it was number 86. In the 2013 through 2021 elections, it was number 85. From the 2025 election, it has been number 84. Its borders have not changed since its creation.

== Members ==
The constituency was first represented by Gregor Gysi of the Party of Democratic Socialism (PDS) from 1990 to 2002. He was succeeded by fellow PDS member Petra Pau in 2002. After the PDS merged into The Left, Pau contested the constituency for that party and was re-elected in 2005, 2009, 2013, and 2017. Mario Czaja was elected for the Christian Democratic Union (CDU) in 2021. He was defeated narrowly in 2025 by Gottfried Curio of the Alternative for Germany (AfD).

Election	Member	Party	%
1990	Gregor Gysi	PDS	31.7
1994	Gregor Gysi	PDS	48.9
1998	Gregor Gysi	PDS	46.7
2002	Petra Pau	PDS	37.7
2005	Petra Pau	LINKE	42.6
2009	Petra Pau	LINKE	47.6
2013	Petra Pau	LINKE	38.9
2017	Petra Pau	LINKE	34.2
2021	Mario Czaja	CDU	29.4
2025	Gottfried Curio	AfD	29.5

== Election results ==
=== 2025 election ===
Federal election (2025): Berlin-Marzahn – Hellersdorf
Notes:	Blue background denotes the winner of the electorate vote. Pink background denotes a candidate elected from their party list. Yellow background denotes an electorate win by a list member, or other incumbent. A ✓ or ✗ denotes status of any incumbent, win or lose respectively.						
Party	Candidate	Votes	%	±%	Party votes	%	±%
AfD	Gottfried Curio	43,729	29.5	▲13.5	46,285	31.2	▲13.9
CDU	✗ Mario Czaja	43,262	29.2	▼0.5	24,495	16.5	▼0.2
Left	Katalin Gennburg	24,895	16.8	▼5.0	24,761	16.7	▲0.8
SPD	Ben Schneider	12,926	8.7	▼5.7	16,161	10.9	▼12.0
BSW	Oliver Ruhnert	12,754	8.6	New	16,236	10.9	New
Greens	Maren Tepper	6,093	4.1	▼2.0	8,913	6.0	▼2.6
FDP	Konrad Klamann	1,871	1.3	▼3.2	3,806	2.6	▼4.6
Tierschutzpartei					3,365	2.3	▼1.5
Volt					1,143	0.8	▲0.3
FW	Peter Schmidt	1,834	1.2	New	1,038	0.7	▼0.3
PARTEI					1,037	0.7	▼0.9
PdF					395	0.3	New
BD	Sabine Missler	515	0.3	New	300	0.2	New
Team Todenhöfer					196	0.1	▼0.3
MLPD	Christa Wolfer	326	0.2	▲0.1	115	0.1	0.0
MERA25					87	0.1	New
BüSo					63	0.0	0.0
SGP					47	0.0	0.0
Informal votes		1,289			1,050		
Total valid votes		148,205			148,443		
Turnout		149,493	76.3	▲8.8			
AfD gain from CDU	Majority	467	0.3				

=== 2021 election ===
Federal election (2021): Berlin-Marzahn-Hellersdorf
Notes:	Blue background denotes the winner of the electorate vote. Pink background denotes a candidate elected from their party list. Yellow background denotes an electorate win by a list member, or other incumbent. A ✓ or ✗ denotes status of any incumbent, win or lose respectively.						
Party	Candidate	Votes	%	±%	Party votes	%	±%
CDU	Mario Czaja	39,543	29.4	▲7.1	21,954	16.4	▼4.5
Left	✗ Petra Pau	29,388	21.9	▼12.3	21,280	15.9	▼10.2
AfD	Thomas Braun	20,910	15.6	▼5.0	22,596	16.8	▼4.8
SPD	Enrico Bloch	19,892	14.8	▲2.3	31,463	23.5	▲9.0
Greens	Anne Thiel-Klein	8,316	6.2	▲2.9	11,487	8.6	▲4.5
FDP	Alice Schmidt	6,180	4.6	▲1.1	9,804	7.3	▲2.0
Tierschutzpartei	Ina Seidel-Grothe	5,539	4.1		5,102	3.8	▲2.1
Die Grauen					2,550	1.9	▲0.9
PARTEI	Andrea Schulteisz	2,780	2.1		2,196	1.6	0.0
dieBasis	Dietmar Lucas	1,503	1.1				
FW					1,369	1.0	▲0.4
Gesundheitsforschung					762	0.6	▲0.1
Volt					626	0.5	
Pirates					574	0.4	▼0.1
Team Todenhöfer					526	0.4	
NPD					434	0.3	
DKP					308	0.2	▲0.1
Humanists					288	0.2	
du.					190	0.1	0.0
ÖDP					145	0.1	0.0
LKR	Axel Scherka	158	0.1		141	0.1	
BüSo					104	0.1	0.0
V-Partei3					88	0.1	0.0
MLPD	Christa Wolfer	141	0.1		82	0.1	0.0
SGP					47	0.0	0.0
Informal votes		2,783			3,017		
Total valid votes		134,350			134,116		
Turnout		137,133	69.3	0.0			
CDU gain from Left	Majority	10,155	7.5				

=== 2017 election ===
Federal election (2017): Berlin-Marzahn-Hellersdorf
Notes:	Blue background denotes the winner of the electorate vote. Pink background denotes a candidate elected from their party list. Yellow background denotes an electorate win by a list member, or other incumbent. A ✓ or ✗ denotes status of any incumbent, win or lose respectively.						
Party	Candidate	Votes	%	±%	Party votes	%	±%
Left	✓ Petra Pau	46,782	34.2	▼4.7	35,698	26.1	▼6.8
CDU	Monika Grütters	30,480	22.3	▼3.4	28,620	20.9	▼5.1
AfD	Jeannette Auricht	28,167	20.6	▲15.7	29,618	21.6	▲15.3
SPD	Dmitri Geidel	17,172	12.6	▼4.5	19,797	14.5	▼5.7
FDP	Roman-Francesco Rogat	4,852	3.5	▲2.8	7,290	5.3	▲3.6
Greens	Inka Seidel-Grothe	4,440	3.2	▲0.1	5,621	4.1	▲0.2
Tierschutzpartei					2,378	1.7	
PARTEI					2,216	1.6	
FW	Detlef Zelinski	2,010	1.5	▲0.9	899	0.7	▲0.1
Die Grauen	Marianne Seipp	1,470	1.1		1,398	1.0	
MIETERPARTEI	Steffen Doebert	716	0.5				
Pirates					693	0.5	▼2.6
NPD	Andreas Käfer	595	0.5	▼3.7			
Gesundheitsforschung					577	0.4	
DM					336	0.2	
DiB					328	0.2	
BGE					320	0.2	
Menschliche Welt					227	0.2	
DKP					197	0.1	
ÖDP					160	0.1	0.0
du.					156	0.1	
V-Partei³					146	0.1	
MLPD					106	0.1	0.0
BüSo					95	0.1	▼0.1
SGP					43	0.0	0.0
B*					20	0.0	
Informal votes		2,207			2,053		
Total valid votes		136,785			136,939		
Turnout		138,992	69.3	▲4.1			
Left hold	Majority	16,302	11.9	▼1.3			

=== 2013 election ===
Federal election (2013): Berlin-Marzahn-Hellersdorf
Notes:	Blue background denotes the winner of the electorate vote. Pink background denotes a candidate elected from their party list. Yellow background denotes an electorate win by a list member, or other incumbent. A ✓ or ✗ denotes status of any incumbent, win or lose respectively.						
Party	Candidate	Votes	%	±%	Party votes	%	±%
Left	✓ Petra Pau	50,866	38.9	▼8.7	43,026	32.9	▼7.9
CDU	Monika Grütters	33,552	25.7	▲6.2	33,947	26.0	▲7.9
SPD	Iris Spranger	22,341	17.1	▲1.0	25,103	19.2	▲2.7
AfD	Robin Ebser	6,347	4.9		8,319	6.4	
NPD	Fritz Liebenow	5,540	4.2	▲0.5	5,101	3.9	▲0.9
Greens	Stefan Ziller	4,071	3.1	▼2.6	5,068	3.9	▼3.1
Pirates	Björn Glienke	3,668	2.8		3,996	3.1	▼0.3
FDP	Tom Wesener	938	0.7	▼4.8	2,278	1.7	▼5.9
PRO	Manfred Rouhs	1,101	0.8		1,116	0.9	
PARTEI	Lea Joy Friedel	860	0.7		1,114	0.9	
FW	Matthias Schmidt	717	0.5		752	0.6	
Independent	André Otto	499	0.4				
REP					243	0.2	▼0.2
ÖDP					202	0.1	0.0
BüSo	Stefan Tolksdorf	239	0.2	▼1.1	181	0.1	▼0.3
MLPD					111	0.1	0.0
PSG					102	0.1	0.0
BIG					73	0.1	
Informal votes		2,078			2,085		
Total valid votes		130,739			130,732		
Turnout		132,817	65.1	▲1.8			
Left hold	Majority	17,314	13.2	▼15.0			

=== 2009 election ===
Federal election (2009): Berlin-Marzahn-Hellersdorf
Notes:	Blue background denotes the winner of the electorate vote. Pink background denotes a candidate elected from their party list. Yellow background denotes an electorate win by a list member, or other incumbent. A ✓ or ✗ denotes status of any incumbent, win or lose respectively.						
Party	Candidate	Votes	%	±%	Party votes	%	±%
Left	✓ Petra Pau	60,236	47.7	▲5.0	51,662	40.8	▲6.4
CDU	Monika Grütters	24,563	19.4	▲3.3	22,875	18.1	▲4.0
SPD	Rudolf Kujath	20,336	16.1	▼13.0	20,906	16.5	▼17.6
Greens	Stefan Ziller	7,242	5.7	▲2.0	8,847	7.0	▲1.8
FDP	Klaus Große	6,969	5.5	▲2.5	9,741	7.7	▲2.7
Pirates					4,274	3.4	
NPD	Matthias Wichmann	4,725	3.7	0.0	3,832	3.0	▼0.2
Tierschutzpartei					2,189	1.7	
BüSo	Stefan Tolksdorf	1,564	1.2	▲0.3	579	0.5	▲0.1
Independent	Jürgen Beck	766	0.6				
REP					456	0.4	▼0.1
DVU					356	0.3	
DIE VIOLETTEN					249	0.2	
DKP					235	0.2	
ÖDP					189	0.1	
PSG					156	0.1	0.0
MLPD					127	0.1	0.0
Informal votes		2,496			2,224		
Total valid votes		126,401			126,673		
Turnout		128,897	63.4	▼10.1			
Left hold	Majority	35,673	28.3	▲14.7			

=== 2005 election ===
Federal election (2005):Berlin-Marzahn – Hellersdorf
Notes:	Blue background denotes the winner of the electorate vote. Pink background denotes a candidate elected from their party list. Yellow background denotes an electorate win by a list member, or other incumbent. A ✓ or ✗ denotes status of any incumbent, win or lose respectively.						
Party	Candidate	Votes	%	±%	Party votes	%	±%
Left	✓ Petra Pau	61,845	42.6	▲4.9	50,042	34.4	▲7.1
SPD	Klaus Mätz	42,132	29.0	▼4.6	49,595	34.1	▼4.6
CDU	Monika Grütters	23,459	16.2	▼1.9	20,499	14.1	▼3.6
NPD	Matthias Wichmann	5,428	3.7	▲1.1	4,634	3.2	▲1.6
Greens	Stefan Ziller	5,372	3.7	▲1.1	7,588	5.2	▲0.5
FDP	Christa Mientus	4,356	3.0	▼0.5	7,241	4.98	▲0.4
GRAUEN					2,267	1.6	▲0.9
BüSo	Heiko Ziemann	1,326	0.9	▲0.4	501	0.3	▲0.1
Independent	Erhard Thomas	1,146	0.8				
Feminist					1,116	0.8	▲0.1
REP					731	0.5	▼0.3
PARTEI					633	0.4	
SGP					226	0.2	
APPD					164	0.1	
MLPD					163	0.1	
Informal votes		2,604			2,268		
Total valid votes		145,064			145,400		
Turnout		147,668	73.5	▲1.8			
Left hold	Majority	19,713	13.6				
