= Derya Çağlar =

German politician (born 1982)

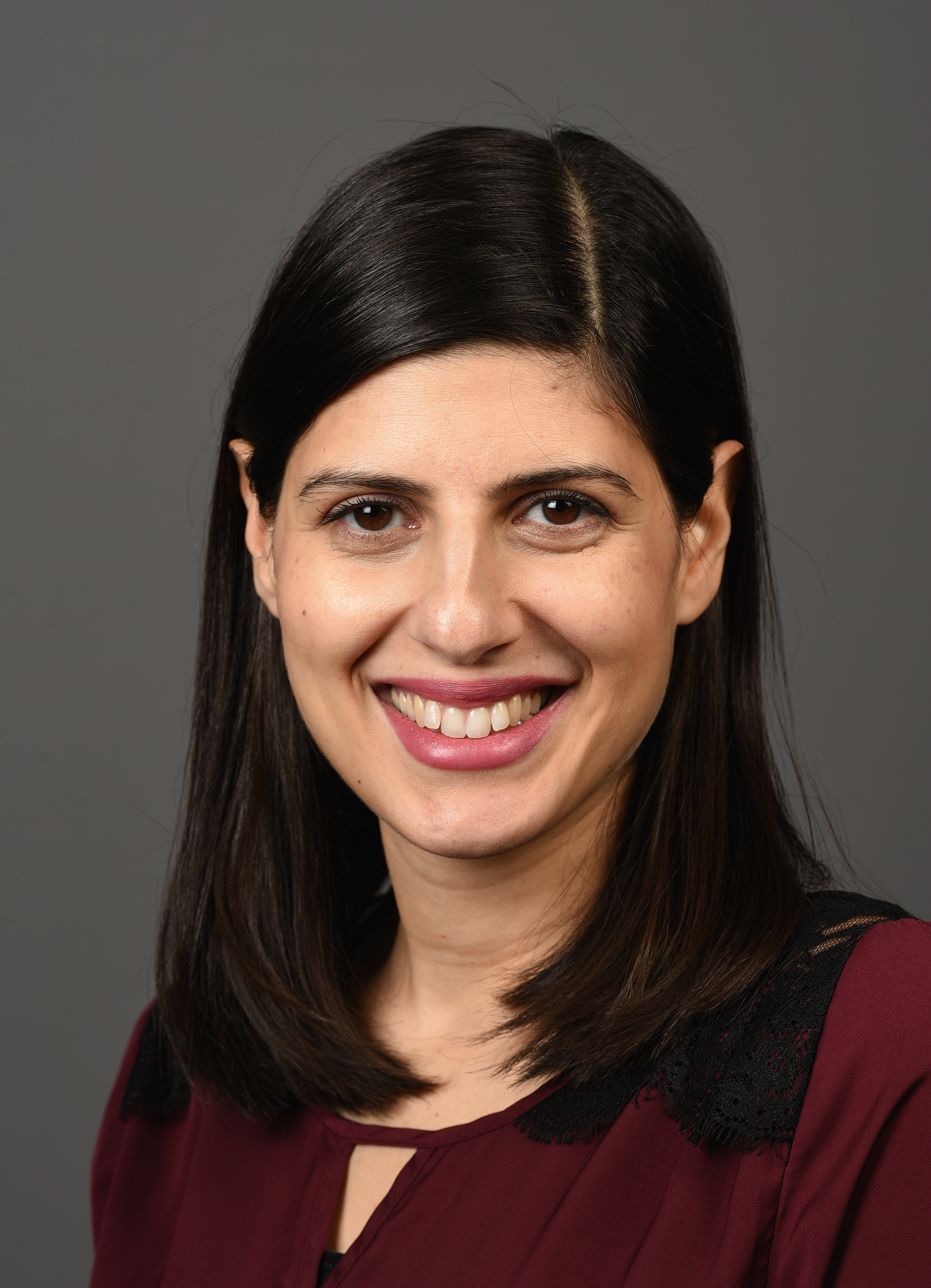
- Çağlar in 2017

Member of the Abgeordnetenhaus of Berlin
- Incumbent
- Assumed office 27 October 2016
- Preceded by: Robbin Juhnke
- Constituency: Neukölln 4 (2016–2021); Neukölln 3 (2021–present)

Personal details
- Born: 17 October 1982 (age 44) Berlin
- Party: Social Democratic Party (since 2005)

Derya Çağlar (born 17 October 1982 in Berlin), is a German politician serving as a member of the Abgeordnetenhaus of Berlin since 2016. She has served as chairwoman of the Social Democratic Party in Neukölln since 2024.
