= Frank Steffel =

German politician

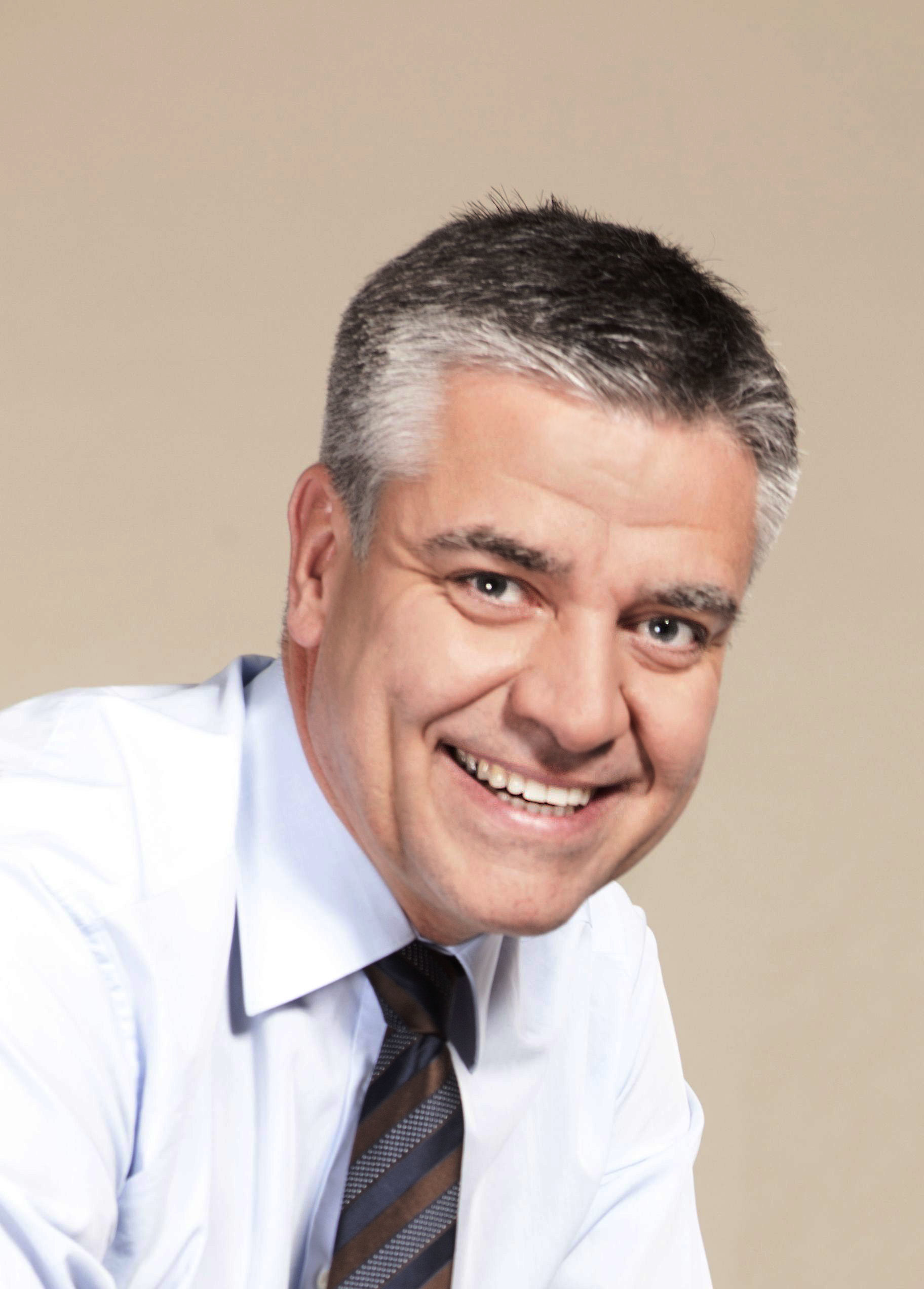
- Steffel in 2011

Member of the Bundestag; for Berlin-Reinickendorf
- In office 27 October 2009 – 26 October 2021
- Preceded by: Detlef Dzembritzki
- Succeeded by: Monika Grütters

Member of the; Berlin House of Representatives
- In office 11 January 1991 – 3 December 2009
- Preceded by: Edmund Wroński
- Succeeded by: Michael Wegner
- Constituency: Reinickendorf 7 (1991–1995); Reinickendorf 5 (1995–1999); Reinickendorf 6 (1999–2009)

Personal details
- Born: 2 March 1966 (age 60) West Berlin, West Germany
- Party: Christian Democratic Union
- Children: 2
- Education: Free University of Berlin

Frank Steffel (born 2 March 1966) is a German politician of the Christian Democratic Party (CDU).

== Early life and education ==
Born in West Berlin, Steffel grew up in Berlin's Frohnau district.

== Political career ==
Steffel has been a member of the CDU and CSU since 1983. He was a member of the State Parliament in Berlin from 1991 to 2009. From 2001 until 2019, he led the CDU in Berlin-Reinickendorf. In the Berlin state elections of 2001 he was the CDU's candidate for the position as Governing Mayor of Berlin. His election campaign was considered unfortunate. For instance he described Munich as Germany's "most beautiful city" and as its "secret capital". Although his party suffered enormous losses at the elections under his leadership, Steffel remained chairman of the CDU group in the State Parliament until 2003. Between 2005 and 2006, he chaired the Sub-Committee on Sports.

Steffel first became a member of the Bundestag in 2009. In parliament, he served on the Committee on Sports. From 2013 until 2017, he was a member of the Finance Committee, where he served as his parliamentary group's rapporteur on money laundering, tax treaties and land transfer taxes. From 2018, he was also a member of the Committee on Foreign Affairs. In that capacity, he was his parliamentary group's rapporteur on Ukraine, Southern Africa, Japan and the Iberian Peninsula.

In 2019, Steffel announced that he would not stand in the 2021 federal elections but instead resign from active politics by the end of the parliamentary term.

== Other activities ==
- Füchse Berlin, Member of the Advisory Board
- Volker Reitz Foundation, Member of the Board of Trustees
- Spielbank Berlin Gustav Jaenecke GmbH & Co., Member of the Advisory Board
- Bundesverband deutscher Spielbanken, Member of the Advisory Board (2009–2013)

== Political positions ==
In June 2017, Steffel voted against Germany's introduction of same-sex marriage.

== Personal life ==
Steffel has been married since 1994. The couple has two children and lives in Berlin's Frohnau district.
