= Christopher Förster =

German politician (born 1986)

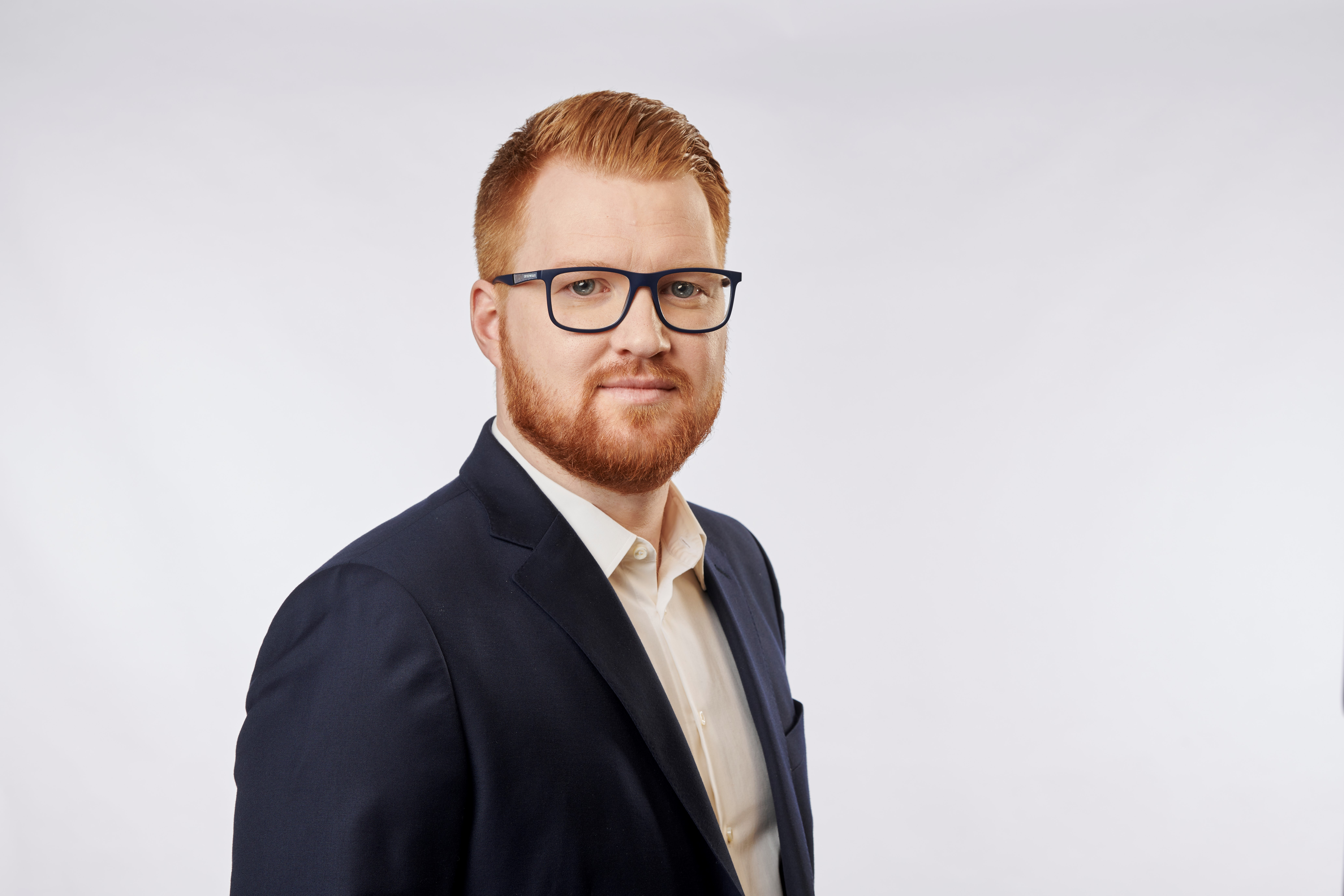
- Förster in 2021

Member of the Berlin House of Representatives
- Incumbent
- Assumed office 4 November 2021
- Constituency: Neukölln (2021–2023); Neukölln 4 (2023–present)

Personal details
- Born: 21 May 1986 (age 40) Berlin
- Party: Christian Democratic Union (since 2002)

Christopher Förster (born 21 May 1986 in Berlin) is a German politician serving as a member of the Berlin House of Representatives since 2021. He has served as chairman of the Christian Democratic Union in Britz since 2015.
