= Charlottenburg-Wilmersdorf 6 =

State electoral district of Germany

- Electoral district for the Berlin House of Representatives
- Charlottenburg-Wilmersdorf 6 in 2026
- District: Charlottenburg-Wilmersdorf
- Electorate: 31,667 (2026)

Current electoral district
- Party: Green
- Member: Jakob Zimmer

Charlottenburg-Wilmersdorf 6 is an electoral constituency (German: Wahlkreis) represented in the House of Representatives of Berlin. It elects one member via first-past-the-post voting.

== Geography ==
The constituency comprises the eastern part of the district of Wilmersdorf, including the areas of Ludwigkirchplatz, Prager Platz, Bundesplatz, and Volkspark, within the borough of Charlottenburg-Wilmersdorf.

There were 31,667 eligible voters in 2026.

== Members ==
| Election | Member | Party | % |
|---|---|---|---|
| 1999 | Monika Grütters | CDU | 47.1 |
| 2001 | Hella Dunger-Löper | SPD | 39.9 |
| 2006 | Hella Dunger-Löper | SPD | 38.2 |
| 2011 | Franziska Becker | SPD | 33.1 |
| 2016 | Franziska Becker | SPD | 30.0 |
| 2021 | Alexander Kaas Elias | Green | 26.4 |
| 2023 | Peer Mock-Stürmer | CDU | 29.2 |
| 2026 | Jakob Zimmer | Green | 29.6 |

== Election results ==
=== 2026 election ===
State election (2026): Charlottenburg-Wilmersdorf 6
| Notes: | Blue background denotes the winner of the electorate vote. Pink background denotes a candidate elected from their party list. Yellow background denotes an electorate win by a list member, or other incumbent. A ✓ or ✗ denotes status of any incumbent, win or lose respectively. | | | | | | |
| Party | Candidate | Votes | % | ±% | Party votes | % | ±% |
|---|---|---|---|---|---|---|---|
| Greens | Jakob Zimmer | 7,100 | 29.6 | ▲4.0 | 5,144 | 21.3 | ▼2.9 |
| CDU | ✗ Peer Mock-Stümer | 5,733 | 23.9 | ▼5.3 | 5,756 | 23.9 | ▼3.7 |
| Left | Sonja Radde | 3,861 | 16.1 | ▲9.1 | 5,034 | 20.9 | ▲12.3 |
| SPD | Ann-Kathrin Biewener | 3,609 | 15.1 | ▼9.0 | 3,655 | 15.2 | ▼6.5 |
| AfD | Tobias Gall | 1,869 | 7.8 | ▲3.6 | 1,960 | 8.1 | ▲3.8 |
| FDP | Sarah Saber-Coad | 650 | 2.7 | ▼2.7 | 779 | 3.2 | ▼3.8 |
| BSW | Christian Matthias Schuchert | 603 | 2.5 | | 685 | 2.8 | |
| Volt | Cara Seeberg | 537 | 2.2 | | 575 | 2.4 | ▲1.2 |
| Tierschutzpartei | | | | | 328 | 1.4 | ▼0.1 |
| PARTEI | | | | | 92 | 0.4 | ▼0.6 |
| PdF | | | | | 45 | 0.2 | |
| ÖDP | | | | | 29 | 0.1 | Steady |
| du. | | | | | 14 | 0.1 | ▼0.1 |
| DKP | | | | | 12 | 0.0 | Steady |
| SGP | | | | | 8 | 0.0 | Steady |
| Informal votes | | 348 | | | 194 | | |
| Total valid votes | | 23,962 | | | 24,116 | | |
| Turnout | | 24,310 | 76.8 | ▲8.8 | | | |
| Greens gain from CDU | Majority | 1,367 | 5.7 | | | | |

=== 2023 repeat election ===
Changes denoted below for the 2023 election are compared to the 2016 election, as the 2021 election was declared invalid.

State election (2023): Charlottenburg-Wilmersdorf 6
| Notes: | Blue background denotes the winner of the electorate vote. Pink background denotes a candidate elected from their party list. Yellow background denotes an electorate win by a list member, or other incumbent. A ✓ or ✗ denotes status of any incumbent, win or lose respectively. | | | | | | |
| Party | Candidate | Votes | % | ±% | Party votes | % | ±% |
|---|---|---|---|---|---|---|---|
| CDU | Peer Mock-Stürmer | 6,101 | 29.2 | ▲6.2 | 5,773 | 27.6 | ▲8.4 |
| Greens | Alexander Kaas Elias | 5,355 | 25.6 | ▲5.9 | 5,070 | 24.2 | ▲3.1 |
| SPD | ✗ Franziska Becker | 5,030 | 24.1 | ▼5.9 | 4,526 | 21.6 | ▼1.7 |
| Left | Michael Efler | 1,465 | 7.0 | ▼1.7 | 1,788 | 8.5 | ▼1.2 |
| FDP | Heinrich Ludwig Forstner | 1,126 | 5.4 | ▼4.1 | 1,462 | 7.0 | ▼4.4 |
| AfD | Marcus Erich Linus Lausch | 887 | 4.2 | ▼4.8 | 912 | 4.4 | ▼4.6 |
| Tierschutzpartei | Helmus Wolff | 400 | 1.9 | | 296 | 1.4 | Steady |
| Volt | | | | | 249 | 1.2 | |
| PARTEI | Wilfried Skoppeck | 296 | 1.4 | | 214 | 1.0 | ▼0.3 |
| dieBasis | Volker Rendez | 117 | 0.6 | | 101 | 0.5 | |
| Gray Panthers | | | | | 61 | 0.3 | ▼0.4 |
| Pirates | | | | | 50 | 0.2 | ▼1.1 |
| Team Todenhöfer | | | | | 50 | 0.2 | |
| Humanists | | | | | 47 | 0.2 | |
| The Grays | | | | | 46 | 0.2 | |
| FW | Gabriela Hinz | 89 | 0.4 | | 45 | 0.2 | |
| du. | | | | | 39 | 0.2 | |
| Klimaliste | | | | | 36 | 0.2 | |
| Mieterpartei | | | | | 29 | 0.1 | |
| Verjüngungsforschung | | | | | 28 | 0.1 | ▼0.1 |
| ÖDP | | | | | 16 | 0.1 | |
| Bildet Berlin! | | | | | 16 | 0.1 | |
| Bergpartei, die ÜberPartei | | | | | 14 | 0.1 | |
| DKP | | | | | 13 | 0.1 | Steady |
| SGP | | | | | 9 | 0.0 | |
| The Pinks/Alliance 21 | | | | | 9 | 0.0 | |
| New Democrats | | | | | 8 | 0.0 | |
| LKR | Paul Daniel Seifert | 12 | 0.1 | | 3 | 0.0 | ▼0.4 |
| NPD | | | | | 3 | 0.0 | ▼0.2 |
| BüSo | | | | | 3 | 0.0 | Steady |
| German Conservative | | | | | 2 | 0.0 | |
| Informal votes | | 150 | | | 125 | | |
| Total valid votes | | 20,878 | | | 20,918 | | |
| Turnout | | 21,064 | 68.0 | ▼2.9 | | | |
| CDU hold | Majority | 746 | 3.6 | | | | |

=== 2021 election (annulled) ===
The election in 2021 was annulled and rerun in 2023.

State election (2021): Charlottenburg-Wilmersdorf 6
| Notes: | Blue background denotes the winner of the electorate vote. Pink background denotes a candidate elected from their party list. Yellow background denotes an electorate win by a list member, or other incumbent. A ✓ or ✗ denotes status of any incumbent, win or lose respectively. | | | | | | |
| Party | Candidate | Votes | % | ±% | Party votes | % | ±% |
|---|---|---|---|---|---|---|---|
| Greens | Alexander Kaas Elias | 6,403 | 26.4 | ▲6.6 | 6,182 | 25.5 | ▲4.4 |
| SPD | ✗ Franziska Becker | 6,384 | 26.3 | ▼3.6 | 5,496 | 22.7 | ▼0.7 |
| CDU | Peer Mock-Stürmer | 5,061 | 20.9 | ▼2.2 | 4,647 | 19.2 | Steady |
| FDP | Heinrich Ludwig Forstner | 2,039 | 8.4 | ▼1.1 | 2,281 | 9.4 | ▼2.0 |
| Left | Michael Efler | 1,950 | 8.0 | ▼0.6 | 2,252 | 9.3 | ▼0.4 |
| AfD | Marcus Erich Linus Lausch | 931 | 3.8 | ▼5.2 | 932 | 3.9 | ▼5.2 |
| Volt | | | | | 395 | 1.6 | |
| Tierschutzpartei | Helmus Wolff | 465 | 1.9 | | 358 | 1.5 | ▲0.1 |
| PARTEI | Wilfried Skoppeck | 389 | 1.6 | | 347 | 1.4 | ▲0.1 |
| dieBasis | Volker Rendez | 357 | 1.5 | | 278 | 1.1 | |
| Team Todenhöfer | | | | | 170 | 0.7 | |
| FW | Gabriela Hinz | 223 | 0.9 | | 146 | 0.6 | |
| Klimaliste | | | | | 93 | 0.4 | |
| The Grays | | | | | 81 | 0.3 | |
| Gray Panthers | | | | | 75 | 0.3 | ▼0.3 |
| Pirates | | | | | 72 | 0.3 | ▼1.0 |
| Humanists | | | | | 65 | 0.3 | |
| APT | | | | | 60 | 0.2 | |
| Mieterpartei | | | | | 49 | 0.2 | |
| Verjüngungsforschung | | | | | 44 | 0.2 | ▼0.1 |
| du. | | | | | 39 | 0.2 | |
| Bildet Berlin! | | | | | 32 | 0.1 | |
| ÖDP | | | | | 25 | 0.1 | |
| LKR | Paul Daniel Seifert | 26 | 0.1 | | 17 | 0.1 | |
| Bergpartei, die ÜberPartei | | | | | 16 | 0.1 | |
| DKP | | | | | 15 | 0.1 | Steady |
| The Pinks/Alliance 21 | | | | | 11 | 0.0 | |
| New Democrats | | | | | 10 | 0.0 | |
| NPD | | | | | 5 | 0.0 | ▼0.2 |
| BüSo | | | | | 3 | 0.0 | ▼0.1 |
| SGP | | | | | 3 | 0.0 | Steady |
| German Conservative | | | | | 0 | 0.0 | |
| Informal votes | | 254 | | | 171 | | |
| Total valid votes | | 24,228 | | | 24,199 | | |
| Turnout | | 24,552 | 78.8 | ▲7.9 | | | |
| Greens gain from SPD | Majority | 19 | 0.1 | | | | |

== See also ==
- Politics of Berlin
- House of Representatives of Berlin
