= Jakob Zimmer =

German politician (born 1999)

Member of the Berlin House of Representatives
- Assuming office 29 October 2026
- Succeeding: Peer Mock-Stümer
- Constituency: Charlottenburg-Wilmersdorf 6

Personal details
- Born: 1999 (age 26–27)
- Party: Alliance 90/The Greens (since 2020)

Jakob Zimmer (born 1999) is a German politician who was elected member of the Berlin House of Representatives in 2026. From 2021 to 2026, he was a borough councillor of Charlottenburg-Wilmersdorf.
