= Marvin Schulz (politician) =

German politician (born 1994)

Marvin Schulz MdB

Member of the Bundestag; for Berlin-Reinickendorf
- Incumbent
- Assumed office 25 March 2025
- Preceded by: Monika Grütters

Personal details
- Born: 14 November 1994 (age 31) Berlin, Germany
- Party: Christian Democratic Union

Marvin Schulz (born 14 November 1994) is a German politician who was elected as a member of the Bundestag in 2025. He has served as leader of the Christian Democratic Union in the district council of Reinickendorf since 2021, and previously served as leader of the Young Union in the district.
