= Katina Schubert =

German politician

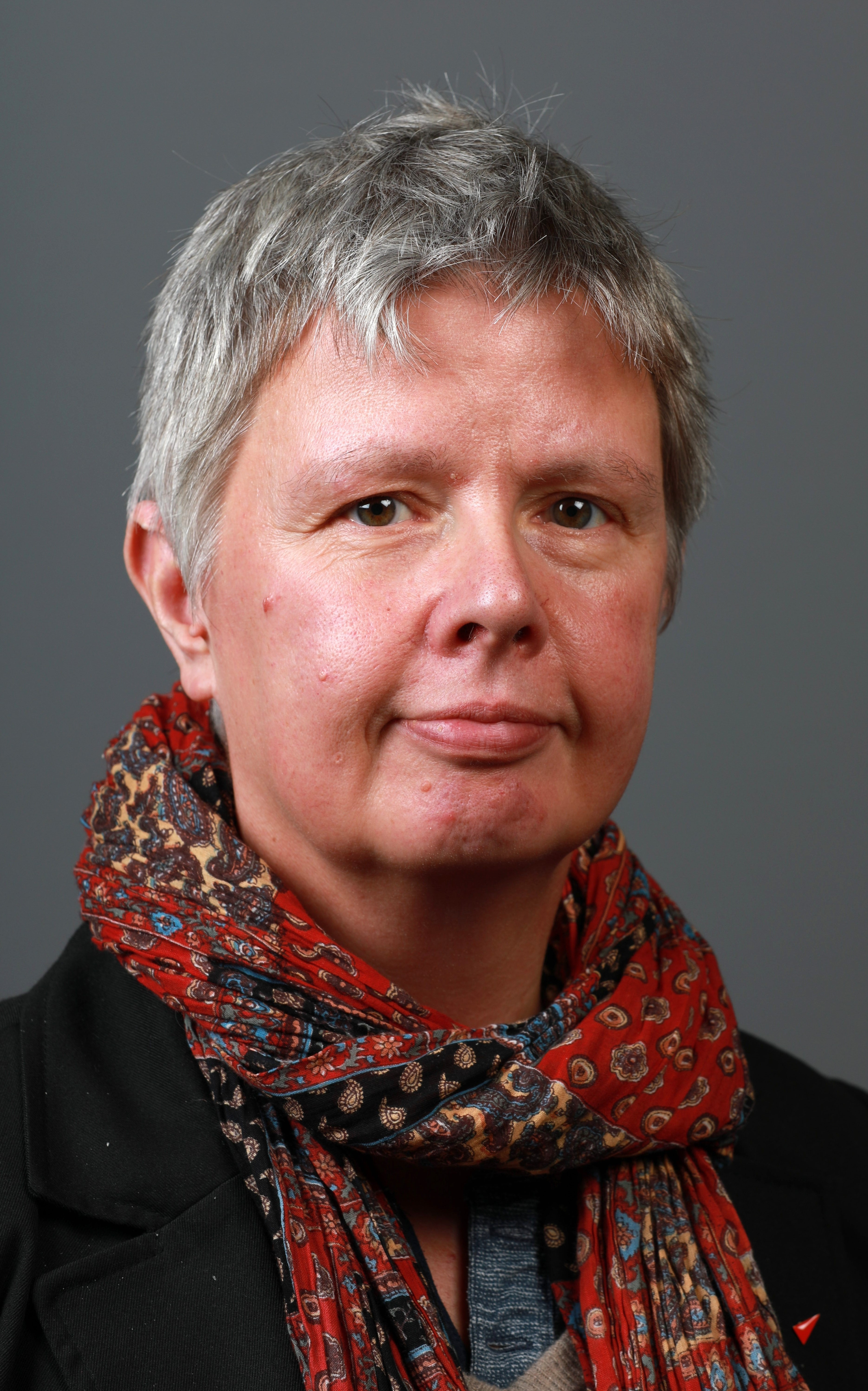
- Schubert in 2017

Leader of The Left in Berlin
- Incumbent
- Assumed office 10 December 2016
- Preceded by: Klaus Lederer

Member of the Abgeordnetenhaus of Berlin
- Incumbent
- Assumed office 18 September 2016

Personal details
- Born: Katina Schubert; 28 December 1961 (age 64) Heidelberg, Baden-Württemberg, West Germany
- Party: The Left
- Education: University of Bonn

Katina Schubert (born 28 December 1961) is a German politician who is serving as leader of the Berlin branch of The Left and member of the Abgeordnetenhaus of Berlin since 2016. Since 2021, she has also been one of six deputy federal leaders of The Left.

== Education and career ==
Schubert studied political science, sociology and economics at the University of Bonn from 1981 to 1989, graduating with a master's degree. She completed a traineeship as an economic journalist from 1990 to 1993. She was then Bonn correspondent for the daily newspaper Junge Welt from 1994 to 1997.

After her studies and traineeship, she began a career as a consultant in the Bundestag and Senate of Berlin. She first became research assistant to Ulrich Briefs, a non-attached member of the Bundestag (formerly Greens and PDS), in 1994. The same year, she began working as an asylum and migration consultant for the PDS Bundestag group, though she did not join the party until 2001. She was involved in setting up Petra Pau's Bundestag office in 1998. She then became personal assistant to Vice-President of the Bundestag Petra Bläss until 2001, and from May 2001 to October 2002 an advisor to the executive committee of the PDS group.

From 2002 to 2004, Schubert worked as an expert witness for the Scientific Service of the Bundestag. From 2004 to 2012, she was personal secretary to various senior PDS politicians in Berlin; firstly Harald Wolf, Senator for Economics, Labor and Women. After the 2006 Berlin state election, she became secretary to Senator for Integration, Labor and Social Affairs Carola Bluhm. From 2010 to 2012, she was secretary to Klaus Lederer, chairman of the Berlin branch of the Left.

Schubert is a member of ver.di, Nicaragua Aid Bonn, People's Solidarity, the Federation of Democratic Scientists, and the Women's Counsellig Centre Against Sexual Violence in Bonn.

== Politics ==
Schubert became involved in politics during her time in university. From 1980 to 1982 she was active in Jusos, the youth branch of the Social Democratic Party (SPD), campaigning for a youth center in Bad Godesberg. She was also involved with the List of Undogmatic Students at the University of Bonn from 1983 to 1989, part of the extraparliamentary left.

Schubert became a member of the Party of Democratic Socialism (PDS) in 2001. In June 2003, she was elected to the party executive and became spokeswoman for domestic policy. From 2004–05 she was a member of the executive of the Party of the European Left. She was elected co-deputy leader of the PDS in April 2006. She left the party executive in 2008, but was re-elected again in 2010. On 10 June 2012, Schubert was elected managing director of the Berlin branch of The Left. Within the party, Schubert was spokeswoman for the moderate Reform Left Network from 2003 to 2006.

Schubert was elected to the Abgeordnetenhaus in the 2016 Berlin state election on the Left state list, and became spokeswoman for labour and refugee policy as well as a member of the Committee for Integration, Labour and Social Affairs. On 10 December 2016, she was elected as chairwoman of the Berlin Left, succeeding Klaus Lederer, who resigned after being appointed Senator for Culture and Europe in the second Müller senate.

In 2021, Schubert was elected as one of six deputy federal leaders of The Left.

== Wikipedia controversy ==
On 6 December 2007, Schubert filed a criminal complaint against the Wikimedia Foundation due to "the use of anti-constitutional symbols" on German Wikipedia. Specifically, she cited the displaying of Nazi iconography on articles, such as that of the Hitler Youth, claiming that it "goes beyond what is needed for documentation and political education". She stated that she was concerned about how platforms such as Wikipedia could be exploited by far-right extremists to promote their views, and hoped to spark a public debate about the issue. Her actions drew significant criticism, including from her party. Fellow Left politician Heiko Hilker rejected Schubert's position, saying that "she fails to grasp the self-regulating mechanisms that work in Wikipedia." After a conversation with Wikimedia representatives, Schubert withdrew her complaint the next day, though she maintained her criticism of the site.

== See also ==
- Lutz Heilmann, another member of The Left who filed a lawsuit against Wikipedia in 2008
