= Lutz Heilmann =

German politician (born 1966)

Member of the German Parliament for Schleswig-Holstein
- In office 2005–2009

Personal details
- Born: 7 September 1966 (age 60) Zittau, East Germany
- Party: Die Linke
- Other political affiliations: SED (1986–1989); SED-PDS (1989–1990); PDS (1990–1992; 2000–2005); Die Linkspartei.PDS (2005–2007)
- Profession: Stasi employee (1985–1990); Cashier at filling station and carpet salesman (1991–2004); Articled clerk (2005)

Lutz Heilmann (born 7 September 1966) is a German politician of the left-wing party Die Linke. He was elected to the Bundestag in the 2005 federal election as a member of the party list in Schleswig-Holstein. Shortly thereafter it was revealed that he had worked for the Stasi (the East German secret police) from 1985 to 1990. Heilmann drew national and international media attention when he caused the website www.wikipedia.de (not the German Wikipedia, but a search portal for it run by Wikimedia Deutschland) to be blocked by a preliminary injunction on 13 November 2008. His Bundestag term ended in 2009, and he failed to be nominated for a second term.

== Revelation of Stasi work ==
Following his election in 2005, strong controversy erupted when it was revealed by the magazine Der Spiegel that he had worked for the Stasi (the East German secret police) from 1985 to 1990. Heilmann is the only official full-time Stasi employee to be elected MP to the Bundestag; although several other Die Linke politicians have been "unofficial" Stasi informants.

Heilmann narrowly survived an impeachment by the party electorate following his untruthfulness about his Stasi career prior to becoming an MP.

Heilmann worked in the so-called "Hauptverwaltung Aufklärung Personenschutz" department of Stasi, a large and important department within the Stasi that was directly subordinated under Erich Mielke. The department was responsible for "personal security", but also took part in regular oppression activities and employed informants. His employment record at Stasi states that Heilmann joined the Stasi because of political motivation and that he identified with his work and saw his future as a Stasi employee. He left Stasi after it was dissolved following the fall of the communist regime.

The nomination of Lutz Heilmann as an MP by the Left Party was strongly criticized by Hubertus Knabe, the director of the Berlin-Hohenschönhausen Memorial. Knabe stated that Heilmann "has no business being in parliament", and said it is "unacceptable for the victims of the GDR communist regime to imagine that a man with such a past should serve in a parliament".

== Early life ==
Heilmann was born in Zittau, East Germany. He attended law school from 1992 to 2004, obtaining an undergraduate law degree (Diplom-Jurist) in 2004. During this time, he worked as a cashier at a filling station and as a carpet salesman. After a period of being unemployed (2004–2005) he obtained a position as articled clerk (Rechtsreferendar) at the Landgericht (an intermediate court) in Lübeck which he quit after being elected to the Bundestag. In November 2009, he returned to his job as a clerk.

== Political activities ==
He became a member of the communist party of the German Democratic Republic, the Socialist Unity Party of Germany (SED) in 1986, and has remained a member of its successor parties (SED-PDS, PDS, Die Linkspartei.PDS and now Die Linke), although he left the party in 1992 and rejoined in 2000.

Heilmann, who was previously married, has organized participation of the party's queer group at Christopher Street Days.

In the Bundestag, his main activity has focused on transportation policy favoring the environment. He argued for an increase in the LKW-Maut and against a proposed waiver of the motor vehicle tax for new cars.

He has been involved in a fight within Die Linke, trying to get Lübeck party boss Ragnar Lüttke expelled from the party. Four-year-old photographs showing Lüttke at a party celebrating Joseph Stalin's birthday were obtained by a Flensburg newspaper in October 2008.

In 2009 he failed to be nominated again as a Bundestag candidate.

== Lawsuit against Wikimedia Deutschland ==
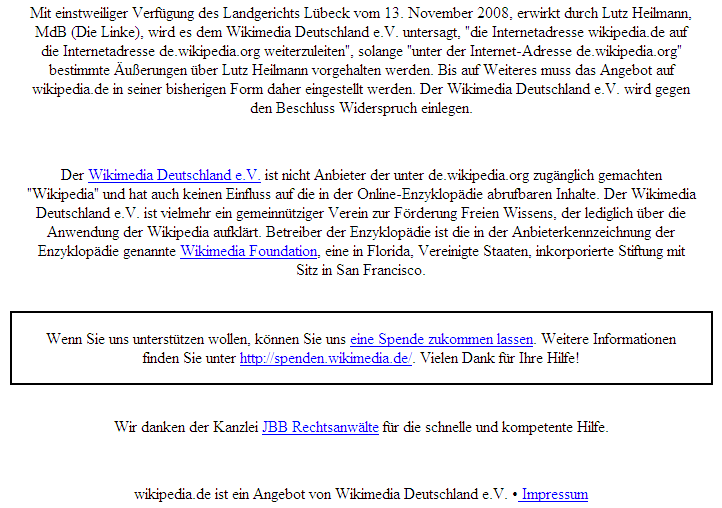
Screenshot of the website www.wikipedia.de on Sunday 16 November 2008

On 13 November 2008, Heilmann pressed charges against Wikimedia Deutschland e.V. at the Landgericht Lübeck, obtaining a preliminary injunction which barred the internet address www.wikipedia.de (which is controlled by Wikimedia Deutschland) from linking to de.wikipedia.org (controlled by the U.S.-based Wikimedia Foundation) as long as certain information about him is included in the German Wikipedia in the article Lutz Heilmann. Heilmann also filed legal complaints against one Wikipedia editor and two other online writers.

According to Focus Online, Heilmann objected to claims that he had not completed his university degree, and that he had participated in a business venture involving pornography. He did however admit that he had served as "youth protection officer" for an internet sex shop run by a roommate. The report also suggests that the Wikipedia article had been repeatedly altered in line with his claims by an anonymous user operating within the Bundestag building, but Heilmann denied having been involved in an edit war.

In October 2008, some German newspapers reported that Heilmann was under investigation for having threatened a former roommate and that the committee on immunity of the Bundestag had lifted his immunity in the matter. Heilmann denied this and had a counter statement published. (According to Die Tageszeitung charges were filed due to attempted coercion ("versuchte Nötigung"). Heilmann's response fits this explanation as he states that the committee on immunity of the Bundestag has dealt on 17 October with the matter in question related to short messages he sent to his former roommate.) This matter was reported in Heilmann's Wikipedia article. This claim, as well as claims that he had withheld parts of his Stasi records, were also cited by Heilmann as reasons for his action against Wikimedia Deutschland.

After some statements were removed from his German Wikipedia article and after major media coverage, Heilmann announced on 16 November that he would drop the legal proceedings against Wikimedia Deutschland, regretting that many uninvolved users of the encyclopedia had been affected. He vowed to continue his pursuit of the Wikipedia editor who had originally added the allegedly offensive material.

Heilmann later made a public statement on his actions against Wikipedia. "I didn't think it through and didn't anticipate the consequences," he admitted. Wikimedia Germany reported that on the Saturday of the blocking it had received record donations of €16,000, compared to €3,000 on an average day.

== See also ==
- Katina Schubert, another politician of Die Linke who initiated proceedings against Wikipedia
