= Stefan Ziller =

German politician (born 1981)

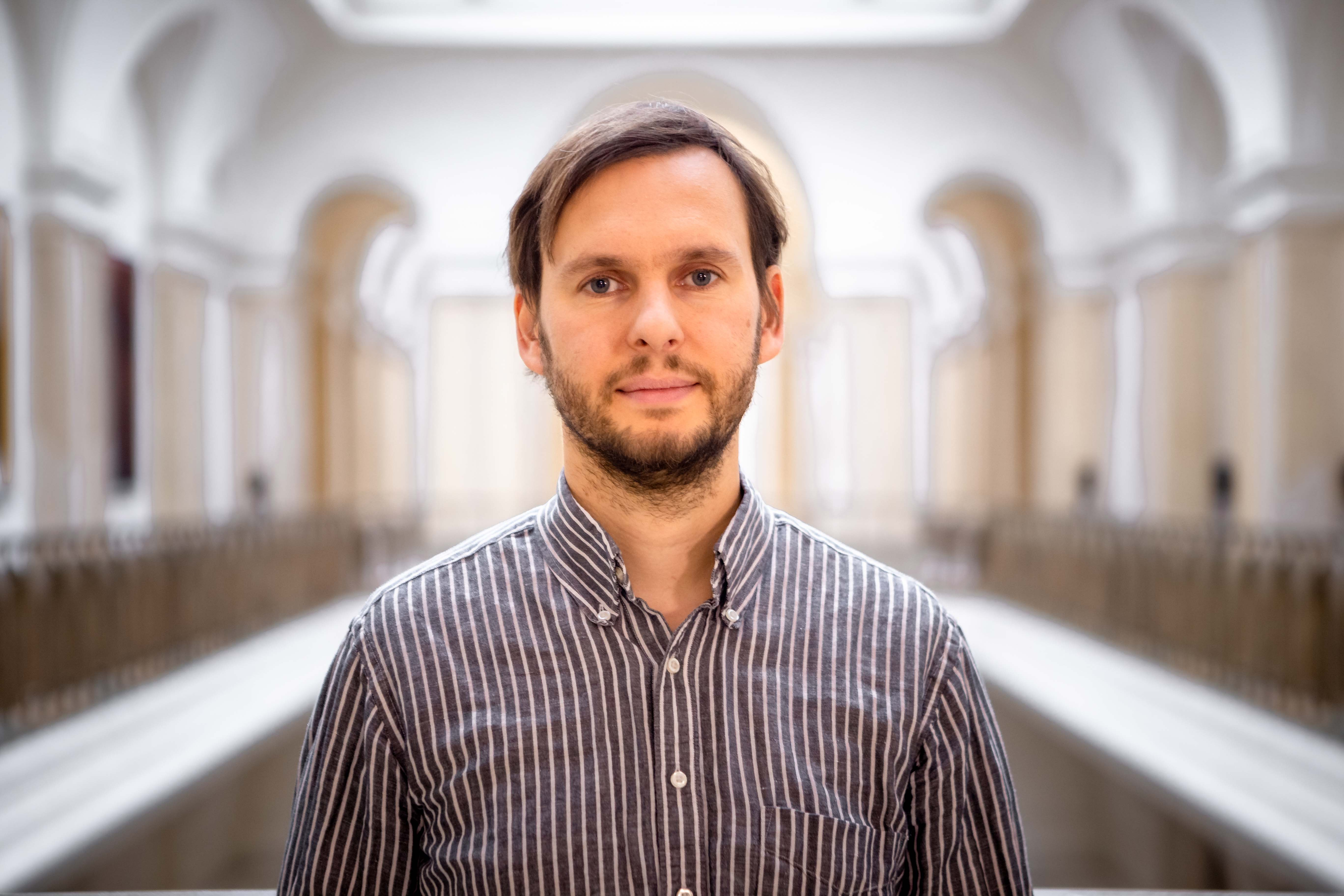
- Ziller in 2021

Member of the Abgeordnetenhaus of Berlin
- Incumbent
- Assumed office 12 May 2016
- Preceded by: Oliver Schruoffeneger
- In office 20 November 2006 – 27 October 2011
- Preceded by: Sibyll-Anka Klotz

Personal details
- Born: 23 May 1981 (age 44) Berlin
- Party: Alliance 90/The Greens (since 2000)

Stefan Ziller (born 23 May 1981 in Berlin) is a German politician. He has been a member of the Abgeordnetenhaus of Berlin since 2016, having previously served from 2006 to 2011. He is a deputy group leader of Alliance 90/The Greens.
