= Neukölln 3 =

State electoral district of Germany

- Electoral district for the Berlin House of Representatives
- Neukölln 3 in 2026
- District: Neukölln
- Electorate: 33,854 (2026)

Current electoral district
- Party: The Left
- Member: Robzbeh Taheri

Neukölln 3 is an electoral constituency (German: Wahlkreis) represented in the House of Representatives of Berlin. It elects one member via first-past-the-post voting.

== Geography ==
The constituency comprises the district of Neukölln outwith the Berlin Ringbahn, as well as the area north of Tempelhofer Weg/Gradestraße/Blaschkoallee/Späthstraße/New Späthstraße to Neue Späthbrücke, and is entirely within the borough of Neukölln.

There were 33,854 eligible voters in 2026.

== Members ==
Election	Member	Party	%
1999	Sabine Toepfer-Kataw	CDU	53.5
2001	Petra Hildebrandt	SPD	40.5
2006	Petra Hildebrandt	SPD	40.5
2011	Joschka Langenbrinck	SPD	36.3
2016	Joschka Langenbrinck	SPD	27.3
2021	Derya Çağlar	SPD	27.2
2023	Derya Çağlar	SPD	23.4
2026	Rouzbeh Taheri	Left	41.2

== Election results ==
=== 2026 election ===
State election (2026): Neukölln 3
Notes:	Blue background denotes the winner of the electorate vote. Pink background denotes a candidate elected from their party list. Yellow background denotes an electorate win by a list member, or other incumbent. A ✓ or ✗ denotes status of any incumbent, win or lose respectively.						
Party	Candidate	Votes	%	±%	Party votes	%	±%
Left	Rouzbeh Taheri	8,738	41.2	▲22.3	9,252	43.2	▲25.6
Greens	Christina Hilmer-Benedict	3,162	14.9	▼6.2	2,821	13.2	▼9.7
SPD	✗ Derya Çağlar	3,048	14.4	▼9.0	2,401	11.2	▼9.1
AfD	Thomas Arhelger	2,398	11.3	▲4.6	2,326	10.9	▲4.3
CDU	Nimet Avci	2,080	9.8	▼11.2	2,105	9.8	▼10.2
BSW	Nader Khalil	1,096	5.2		1,202	5.6	
Tierschutzpartei					391	1.8	▼0.4
Volt	Max Lodel	355	1.7		327	1.5	▲0.8
FDP					272	1.3	▼1.2
PARTEI	Sebastian Richter	324	1.5	▼0.8	162	0.8	▼0.9
PdF					62	0.3	
du.					29	0.1	▼0.4
ÖDP					28	0.1	▲0.1
DKP					22	0.1	▼0.1
SGP					8	0.0	Steady
Informal votes		461			254		
Total valid votes		21,201			21,408		
Turnout		21,662	64.0	▲14.7			
Left gain from SPD	Majority	5,576	26.3				

=== 2023 repeat election ===
Changes denoted below for the 2023 election are compared to the 2016 election, as the 2021 election was declared invalid.

State election (2023): Neukölln 3
Notes:	Blue background denotes the winner of the electorate vote. Pink background denotes a candidate elected from their party list. Yellow background denotes an electorate win by a list member, or other incumbent. A ✓ or ✗ denotes status of any incumbent, win or lose respectively.						
Party	Candidate	Votes	%	±%	Party votes	%	±%
SPD	Derya Çağlar	3,739	23.4	▼5.9	3,251	20.3	▼4.7
Greens	Georg Philipp Kössler	3,367	21.1	▲5.6	3,651	22.8	▲7.0
CDU	Gabriele Köstner	3,351	21.0	▲6.3	3,201	20.0	▲6.0
Left	Mortiz Wittler	3,023	18.9	▲3.7	2,818	17.6	▲1.1
AfD	Marlies Becker	1,079	6.8	▼6.3	1,047	6.5	▼6.6
Tierschutzpartei	Denise Krause	557	3.5		363	2.3	▲0.1
FDP	Sophia Bellmann	370	2.3	▼1.7	397	2.5	▼1.9
PARTEI	Marco Holtz	369	2.3	▼1.2	260	1.6	▼1.5
Team Todenhöfer					215	1.3	
Volt					122	0.8	
du.					82	0.5	
Klimaliste					78	0.5	
dieBasis	Birgit Diederichsen	112	0.7		66	0.4	
Pirates					62	0.4	▼2.0
Gray Panthers					59	0.4	▼0.7
Humanists					58	0.4	
The Grays					42	0.3	
Verjüngungsforschung					40	0.3	▼0.1
Mieterpartei					36	0.2	
DKP					32	0.2	▼0.1
Bergpartei, die ÜberPartei					26	0.2	
FW					21	0.1	
Bildet Berlin!					20	0.1	
ÖDP					12	0.1	
SGP					11	0.1	Steady
NPD					8	0.1	▼0.9
LKR					5	0.0	▼0.4
BüSo					4	0.0	
The Pinks/Alliance 21					3	0.0	
Informal votes		169			135		
Total valid votes		15,967			15,990		
Turnout		16,153	49.3	▼5.1			
SPD hold	Majority	372	2.3				

=== 2021 election (annulled) ===
The election in 2021 was annulled and rerun in 2023.

State election (2021): Neukölln 3
Notes:	Blue background denotes the winner of the electorate vote. Pink background denotes a candidate elected from their party list. Yellow background denotes an electorate win by a list member, or other incumbent. A ✓ or ✗ denotes status of any incumbent, win or lose respectively.						
Party	Candidate	Votes	%	±%	Party votes	%	±%
SPD	Derya Çağlar	5,571	27.2	▼2.2	5,296	25.6	▲0.5
Greens	Georg Philipp Kössler	4,209	20.5	▲5.0	4,100	19.8	▲3.9
Left	Mortiz Wittler	4,188	20.4	▲5.2	3,982	19.2	▲2.7
CDU	Gabriele Köstner	2,584	12.6	▼2.1	2,174	10.5	▼3.5
AfD	Marlies Becker	1,357	6.6	▼6.5	1,220	5.9	▼7.3
Team Todenhöfer					913	4.4	
FDP	Sophia Bellmann	929	4.5	▲0.5	826	4.0	▼0.4
Tierschutzpartei	Denise Krause	801	3.9		444	2.1	Steady
PARTEI	Marco Holtz	552	2.7	▼0.8	410	2.0	▼1.1
dieBasis	Birgit Diederichsen	317	1.5		187	0.9	
Volt					185	0.9	
Klimaliste					152	0.7	
FW					111	0.5	
du.					106	0.5	
The Grays					102	0.5	
APT					93	0.4	
Gray Panthers					91	0.4	▼0.7
Pirates					75	0.4	▼2.0
Mieterpartei					36	0.2	
Humanists					34	0.2	
Verjüngungsforschung					31	0.1	▼0.2
DKP					27	0.1	▼0.1
ÖDP					27	0.1	
Bergpartei, die ÜberPartei					26	0.1	
NPD					26	0.1	▼0.9
Bildet Berlin!					22	0.1	
LKR					9	0.0	▼0.4
SGP					9	0.0	Steady
BüSo					7	0.0	Steady
The Pinks/Alliance 21					6	0.0	
Informal votes		430			286		
Total valid votes		20,508			20,727		
Turnout		21,044	63.6	▲9.2			
SPD hold	Majority	1,362	6.7				

== See also ==
- Politics of Berlin
- House of Representatives of Berlin
