= Bosiljka Schedlich =

Croatian-German human rights activist (born 1948)

- Born: Bosiljka Grgurević; 4 December 1948 (age 77); Divojevići, Yugoslavia
- Citizenship: Croatia; Germany
- Education: Free University of Berlin
- Years active: 1991–present
- Organization: Südost Europa Kultur e.V.
- Honours: 1000 PeaceWomen

Bosiljka Schedlich (née Grgurević; born 4 December 1948) is a Croatian-German human rights activist, known for her advocacy for people traumatised by war.

== Early life and education ==
Schedlich was born on 4 December 1948 in the village of Divojevići in what is now Split-Dalmatia County in Croatia, the daughter of a Titoist partisan. She was raised by her mother in Divojevići before moving to reside with her father and siblings in the city of Split. After graduating from high school, Schedlich moved to Berlin, West Germany in 1968, initially planning to work for a year before returning to Yugoslavia to study at university in Zadar. After working for Telefunken doing quality control work for record player needles whilst learning German, Schedlich left after six months to work as an interpreter, first at student accommodation, and later at a labour court. Schedlich remained in Berlin, eventually studying German literature at the Free University of Berlin, where she met her husband, a German citizen, with whom she had two children. Klara Schedlich, who became the youngest member of the Berlin House of Representatives in 2021, is Schedlich's granddaughter.

== Activism ==
During the 1980s, Schedlich established two counselling centres in German for Yugoslavian women. In 1991, after tens of thousands of Yugoslavian refugees came to Berlin during the Yugoslav Wars, Schedlich founded Südost Europa Kultur e.V. (lit. 'Southeast Europe Culture Association'), remaining as its managing director until 2014. The association, which supported over 30,000 refugees, was notable for offering support to refugees from former Yugoslavia regardless of their nationality, unlike many similar organisations set up at the time. Schedlich provided group therapy, counselling, German language courses, vocational training and art groups, in addition to providing sponsorships for people to return to their home countries. She also campaigned against the Yugoslav Wars. Over time, Südost Europa Kultur e.V. expanded its operations to provide services in former Yugoslav countries, such as setting up schools for Roma children, and starting storytelling cafés in Bosnia and Herzegovina. In 2000, Schedlich, as part of Südost Europa Kultur e.V., was awarded the Louise Schroeder Medal for services to democracy, peace, social justice and equality.

In 2007, Schedlich co-founded the Überbrücken foundation alongside Wolfgang Huber, to support people experiencing crises and to overcome the effects of war as a "precondition for the process of peacebuilding".

In 2005, Schedlich was one of a thousand women named as the 1000 PeaceWomen, who were jointly nominated for the Nobel Peace Prize.
