= Gottfried Curio =

German politician (born 1960)

Gottfried Curio MdB
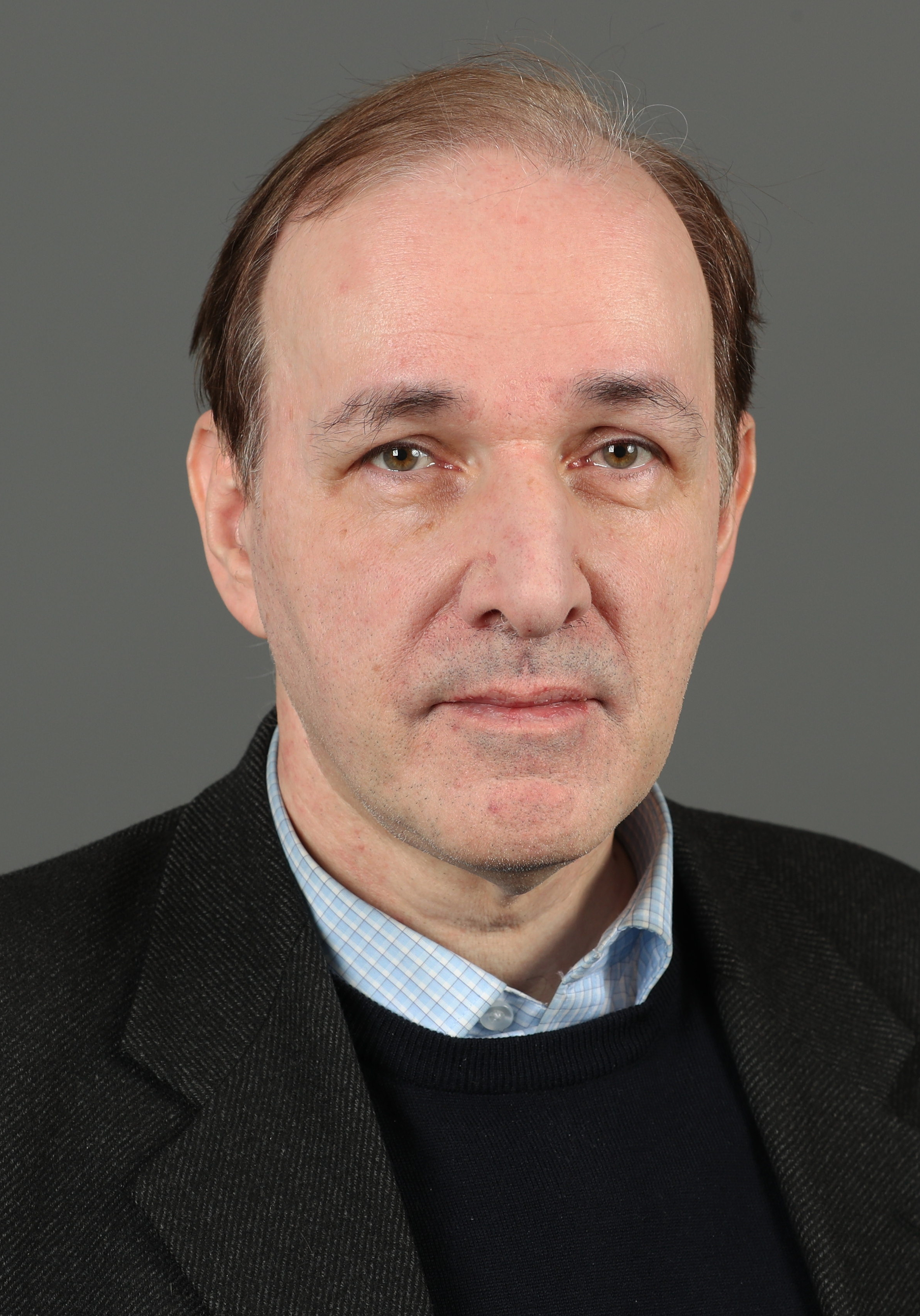
- Curio in 2020

Member of the Bundestag; from Berlin
- Incumbent
- Assumed office 24 October 2017
- Constituency: State list (2017–2025); Berlin-Marzahn – Hellersdorf (2025–present)

Member of the; Berlin House of Representatives
- In office October 2016 – 24 October 2017
- Preceded by: Multi-member district
- Succeeded by: Tommy Tabor
- Constituency: State list

Personal details
- Born: Gottfried Justus Immanuel Curio; 2 September 1960 (age 66) West Berlin, West Germany
- Party: Alternative for Germany
- Education: Free University of Berlin; University of Bonn; Humboldt University of Berlin

Gottfried Justus Immanuel Curio (born 2 September 1960) is a German politician for the Alternative for Germany (AfD) and since 2017 member of the Bundestag. Before that, he was teaching and a researcher as a habilitated physicist at several universities.

Curio is the party's spokesman for home affairs.

== Biography ==
Curio was born 1960 in West-Berlin and studied physics and mathematics at the Free University of Berlin. Curio entered the AfD in 2014 and became after the 2016 Berlin state election member of the 'Abgeordnetenhaus' (house of delegates), the federal state diet of Berlin.

In 2017 Curio was elected to the Bundestag, the German federal parliament.
