= Neukölln 4 =

State electoral district of Germany

- Electoral district for the Berlin House of Representatives
- Neukölln 4 in 2026
- District: Neukölln
- Electorate: 32,430 (2026)

Current electoral district
- Party: CDU
- Member: Christopher Forester

Neukölln 4 is an electoral constituency (German: Wahlkreis) represented in the House of Representatives of Berlin. It elects one member via first-past-the-post voting.

== Geography ==
The constituency comprises the district of Britz south of Späthstraße and Neue Späthstraße, east of the line Buschkrugallee/Parchimer Allee/Fritz-Reuter-Allee/Gutschmidtstraße/Severingstraße along Kölner Damm to the district boundary, and north of the line Friedrich-Kaysler-Weg/Horst-Caspar-Steig/Agnes-Straub-Weg/Neuköllner Straße/Flurweg/Minzeweg/Silberdistelweg. It is entirely within the borough of Neukölln.

There were 32,430 eligible voters in 2026.

== Members ==
| Election | Member | Party | % |
|---|---|---|---|
| 1999 | Reinhard Führer | CDU | 60.1 |
| 2001 | Alexander Kaczmarek | CDU | 42.6 |
| 2006 | Robbin Juhnke | CDU | 39.9 |
| 2011 | Robbin Juhnke | CDU | 38.2 |
| 2016 | Derya Çağlar | SPD | 30.7 |
| 2021 | Marcel Hopp | SPD | 36.2 |
| 2023 | Christopher Forester | CDU | 43.1 |
| 2026 | Christopher Forester | CDU | 26.1 |

== Election results ==
=== 2026 election ===
State election (2026): Neukölln 4
| Notes: | Blue background denotes the winner of the electorate vote. Pink background denotes a candidate elected from their party list. Yellow background denotes an electorate win by a list member, or other incumbent. A ✓ or ✗ denotes status of any incumbent, win or lose respectively. | | | | | | |
| Party | Candidate | Votes | % | ±% | Party votes | % | ±% |
|---|---|---|---|---|---|---|---|
| CDU | ✓ Christopher Förster | 5,282 | 26.1 | ▼16.9 | 4,809 | 23.8 | ▼17.3 |
| SPD | Marcel Hopp | 4,846 | 23.9 | ▼5.8 | 3,501 | 17.4 | ▼10.2 |
| AfD | Robert Eschricht | 4,228 | 20.9 | ▲10.4 | 4,250 | 21.1 | ▲10.4 |
| Left | Yurtsever Özdemir | 3,676 | 18.2 | ▲13.9 | 3,928 | 19.5 | ▲14.9 |
| BSW | Christian Posselt | 1,007 | 5.0 | | 1,156 | 5.7 | |
| Greens | Philmon Ghirmai | 861 | 4.3 | ▼0.8 | 1,056 | 5.2 | Steady |
| Tierschutzpartei | | | | | 558 | 2.8 | ▲0.3 |
| FDP | | | | | 492 | 2.4 | ▼1.2 |
| Volt | Felix Golcher | 339 | 1.7 | | 217 | 1.1 | ▲0.8 |
| PARTEI | | | | | 101 | 0.5 | ▼0.2 |
| PdF | | | | | 42 | 0.2 | |
| ÖDP | | | | | 34 | 0.2 | ▲0.1 |
| du. | | | | | 15 | 0.1 | Steady |
| SGP | | | | | 10 | 0.0 | |
| DKP | | | | | 7 | 0.0 | Steady |
| Informal votes | | 672 | | | 735 | | |
| Total valid votes | | 20,239 | | | 20,186 | | |
| Turnout | | 20,911 | 64.5 | ▲10.3 | | | |
| CDU hold | Majority | 436 | 2.2 | ▼11.1 | | | |

=== 2023 repeat election ===
Changes denoted below for the 2023 election are compared to the 2016 election, as the 2021 election was declared invalid.

State election (2023): Neukölln 4
| Notes: | Blue background denotes the winner of the electorate vote. Pink background denotes a candidate elected from their party list. Yellow background denotes an electorate win by a list member, or other incumbent. A ✓ or ✗ denotes status of any incumbent, win or lose respectively. | | | | | | |
| Party | Candidate | Votes | % | ±% | Party votes | % | ±% |
|---|---|---|---|---|---|---|---|
| CDU | Christopher Forester | 7,477 | 43.0 | ▲19.3 | 7,153 | 41.2 | ▲18.7 |
| SPD | Marcel Hopp | 5,165 | 29.7 | ▼0.8 | 4,782 | 27.5 | ▲0.7 |
| AfD | Robert Eschricht | 1,827 | 10.5 | ▼8.5 | 1,850 | 10.6 | ▼7.8 |
| Greens | Bahar Haghanipour | 876 | 5.0 | ▼3.9 | 907 | 5.2 | ▼3.8 |
| Left | Tony Pohl | 748 | 4.3 | ▼3.4 | 801 | 4.6 | ▼3.2 |
| Tierschutzpartei | Anna Capone | 588 | 3.4 | | 430 | 2.5 | Steady |
| FDP | Franz Wittke | 533 | 3.1 | ▼3.9 | 627 | 3.6 | ▼3.5 |
| Team Todenhöfer | | | | | 148 | 0.9 | |
| PARTEI | | | | | 129 | 0.7 | ▼0.5 |
| Gray Panthers | | | | | 81 | 0.5 | ▼0.7 |
| The Grays | | | | | 61 | 0.4 | |
| dieBasis | Doris Breitenbach | 83 | 0.5 | | 50 | 0.3 | |
| Independent | Christian Pape | 55 | 0.3 | | | | |
| Pirates | | | | | 48 | 0.3 | ▼1.0 |
| Verjüngungsforschung | | | | | 44 | 0.3 | ▼0.2 |
| Volt | | | | | 43 | 0.2 | |
| FW | | | | | 42 | 0.2 | |
| Mieterpartei | | | | | 39 | 0.2 | |
| Bildet Berlin! | | | | | 23 | 0.1 | |
| NPD | | | | | 21 | 0.1 | ▼0.8 |
| Klimaliste | | | | | 20 | 0.1 | |
| du. | | | | | 16 | 0.1 | |
| Humanists | | | | | 13 | 0.1 | |
| The Pinks/Alliance 21 | | | | | 12 | 0.1 | |
| LKR | Christian Lieberam | 17 | 0.1 | | 10 | 0.1 | ▼0.4 |
| ÖDP | | | | | 10 | 0.1 | |
| SGP | | | | | 8 | 0.0 | |
| BüSo | | | | | 4 | 0.0 | |
| DKP | | | | | 4 | 0.0 | |
| Bergpartei, die ÜberPartei | | | | | 1 | 0.0 | |
| Informal votes | | 210 | | | 194 | | |
| Total valid votes | | 17,369 | | | 17,377 | | |
| Turnout | | 17,588 | 54.2 | ▼6.6 | | | |
| CDU gain from SPD | Majority | 2,312 | 13.3 | | | | |

=== 2021 election (annulled) ===
The election in 2021 was annulled and rerun in 2023.

State election (2021): Neukölln 4
| Notes: | Blue background denotes the winner of the electorate vote. Pink background denotes a candidate elected from their party list. Yellow background denotes an electorate win by a list member, or other incumbent. A ✓ or ✗ denotes status of any incumbent, win or lose respectively. | | | | | | |
| Party | Candidate | Votes | % | ±% | Party votes | % | ±% |
|---|---|---|---|---|---|---|---|
| SPD | Marcel Hopp | 7,746 | 36.1 | ▲5.6 | 7,791 | 36.3 | ▲9.5 |
| CDU | Christopher Forester | 5,803 | 27.1 | ▲3.3 | 5,084 | 23.7 | ▲1.2 |
| AfD | Robert Eschricht | 2,307 | 10.8 | ▼8.2 | 2,210 | 10.3 | ▼8.2 |
| Greens | Bahar Haghanipour | 1,443 | 6.7 | ▼2.2 | 1,312 | 6.1 | ▼2.9 |
| FDP | Franz Wittke | 1,387 | 6.5 | ▼0.5 | 1,375 | 6.4 | ▼0.7 |
| Left | Tony Pohl | 1,258 | 5.9 | ▼1.8 | 1,108 | 5.2 | ▼2.6 |
| Team Todenhöfer | | | | | 670 | 3.1 | |
| Tierschutzpartei | Anna Capone | 1,043 | 4.9 | | 587 | 2.7 | ▲0.3 |
| PARTEI | | | | | 208 | 1.0 | ▼0.3 |
| dieBasis | Doris Breitenbach | 267 | 1.2 | | 177 | 0.8 | |
| FW | | | | | 146 | 0.7 | |
| Gray Panthers | | | | | 132 | 0.6 | ▼0.5 |
| The Grays | | | | | 118 | 0.6 | |
| APT | | | | | 112 | 0.5 | |
| Independent | Christian Pape | 110 | 0.5 | | | | |
| Pirates | | | | | 63 | 0.3 | ▼0.9 |
| Volt | | | | | 61 | 0.3 | |
| Verjüngungsforschung | | | | | 57 | 0.3 | ▼0.2 |
| Mieterpartei | | | | | 45 | 0.2 | |
| Humanists | | | | | 31 | 0.1 | |
| du. | | | | | 29 | 0.1 | |
| Bildet Berlin! | | | | | 26 | 0.1 | |
| LKR | Christian Lieberam | 64 | 0.3 | | 25 | 0.1 | ▼0.3 |
| NPD | | | | | 20 | 0.1 | ▼0.8 |
| ÖDP | | | | | 19 | 0.1 | |
| Klimaliste | | | | | 16 | 0.1 | |
| BüSo | | | | | 11 | 0.1 | Steady |
| Bergpartei, die ÜberPartei | | | | | 8 | 0.0 | |
| The Pinks/Alliance 21 | | | | | 5 | 0.0 | |
| SGP | | | | | 4 | 0.0 | Steady |
| DKP | | | | | 3 | 0.0 | Steady |
| Informal votes | | 479 | | | 345 | | |
| Total valid votes | | 21,428 | | | 21,453 | | |
| Turnout | | 22,004 | 66.9 | ▲6.0 | | | |
| SPD hold | Majority | 1,943 | 9.0 | | | | |

== See also ==
- Politics of Berlin
- House of Representatives of Berlin
