= Petra Pau =

German politician, Vice-President of the Bundestag

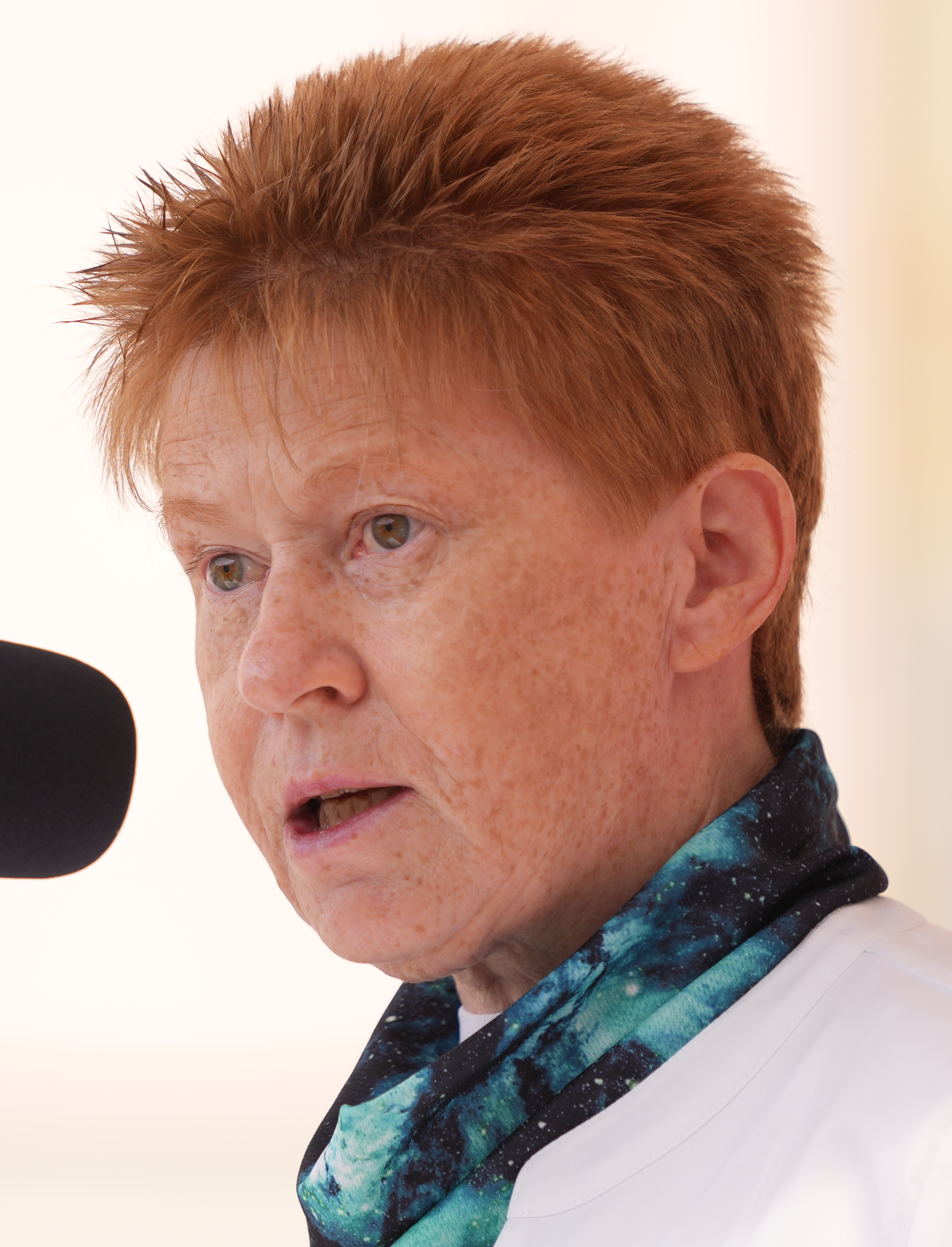
- Pau in 2022

Vice President of the Bundestag (on proposal of The Left-faction)
- In office 7 April 2006 – 25 March 2025
- Preceded by: Position established
- Succeeded by: Bodo Ramelow

Member of the Bundestag; from Berlin
- In office 26 October 1998 – 25 March 2025
- Preceded by: Hanns-Peter Hartmann
- Succeeded by: Multi-member district
- Constituency: Berlin-Mitte – Prenzlauer Berg (1998–2002); Berlin-Marzahn – Hellersdorf (2002–2021); State list (2021–2025)

Member of the; Berlin House of Representatives; for Hellersdorf 3
- In office 30 November 1995 – October 1998
- Preceded by: Werner Krause
- Succeeded by: Constituency abolished

Personal details
- Born: 9 August 1963 (age 63) East Berlin, East Germany
- Party: Die Linke
- Other political affiliations: SED (1983–1989); PDS (1989–2007)
- Education: Parteihochschule Karl Marx
- Website: petrapau.de

Petra Pau (born 9 August 1963) is a German politician of The Left. She has been a member of the Bundestag since 1998. Since 2006, she has also served as one of the Vice Presidents of the Bundestag, being the first member of her party to hold this office. Pau belongs to the reform-oriented wing of her party, actively supporting parliamentary representative democracy.

== Political career ==
Pau's first involvement in politics came in 1983 when she joined the Socialist Unity Party (SED), the governing party of East Germany. She worked as a functionary for the Free German Youth as a leader of the East German pioneers. After German reunification, the SED became the Party of Democratic Socialism (PDS) and she was elected as a PDS member to the Borough Assembly of Hellersdorf in Eastern Berlin in October 1990. She became district chairwoman of the PDS branch in Hellersdorf in October 1991, and was elected chairwoman of the Berlin PDS association in October 1992. From 2000 to 2002, she was deputy chairwoman of the federal party.

She was elected to the state parliament of Berlin in 1995, and remained a member until 1998, when she was elected to the Bundestag for the Berlin Mitte – Prenzlauer Berg constituency. Controversial boundary changes abolished this constituency and for the 2002 election, she contested Berlin-Marzahn-Hellersdorf, regarded as a safe seat for the PDS. She was elected for that constituency and became one of only two members of the Bundestag for her party, which fell below the 5% electoral threshold. The new Left party regained proportional representation in 2005, in part due to Pau being reelected in Marzahn-Hellersdorf and the Left winning two other constituency seats. A party that wins at least three constituency seats qualifies for proportional representation even if it falls below the threshold.

Pau retained the constituency in 2009, 2013, and 2017, but was defeated in 2021 by CDU candidate Mario Czaja. She nonetheless reentered the Bundestag on the Left party list.

After the 2005 federal election, the Left group offered Lothar Bisky as their candidate for Vice President of the Bundestag, but he failed to win a majority after four rounds of voting. They subsequently put forward Pau, who was elected on the first ballot. She has been reelected as Vice President in each subsequent term. Since the 2013 term, she has been the longest-serving Vice President.

Speaking of her upbringing, Pau said: "Of course my past is typical for someone who grew up in the GDR. I was a teacher and Pioneer leader in East Berlin. It is my past which drives me today in my commitment to a democratic society, and I reject any suggestion that this is not the case or even possible." In her capacity as Vice President, she seeks to be impartial but not apolitical, and champions civil rights and democracy.

On 11 October 2024, Pau declared she would not run again for the Bundestag.

== Literature ==
- Michael F. Feldkamp (ed.), Der Bundestagspräsident. Amt – Funktion – Person. 16. Wahlperiode, München 2007, ISBN 978-3-7892-8201-0
