= Monika Grütters =

German politician (born 1962)

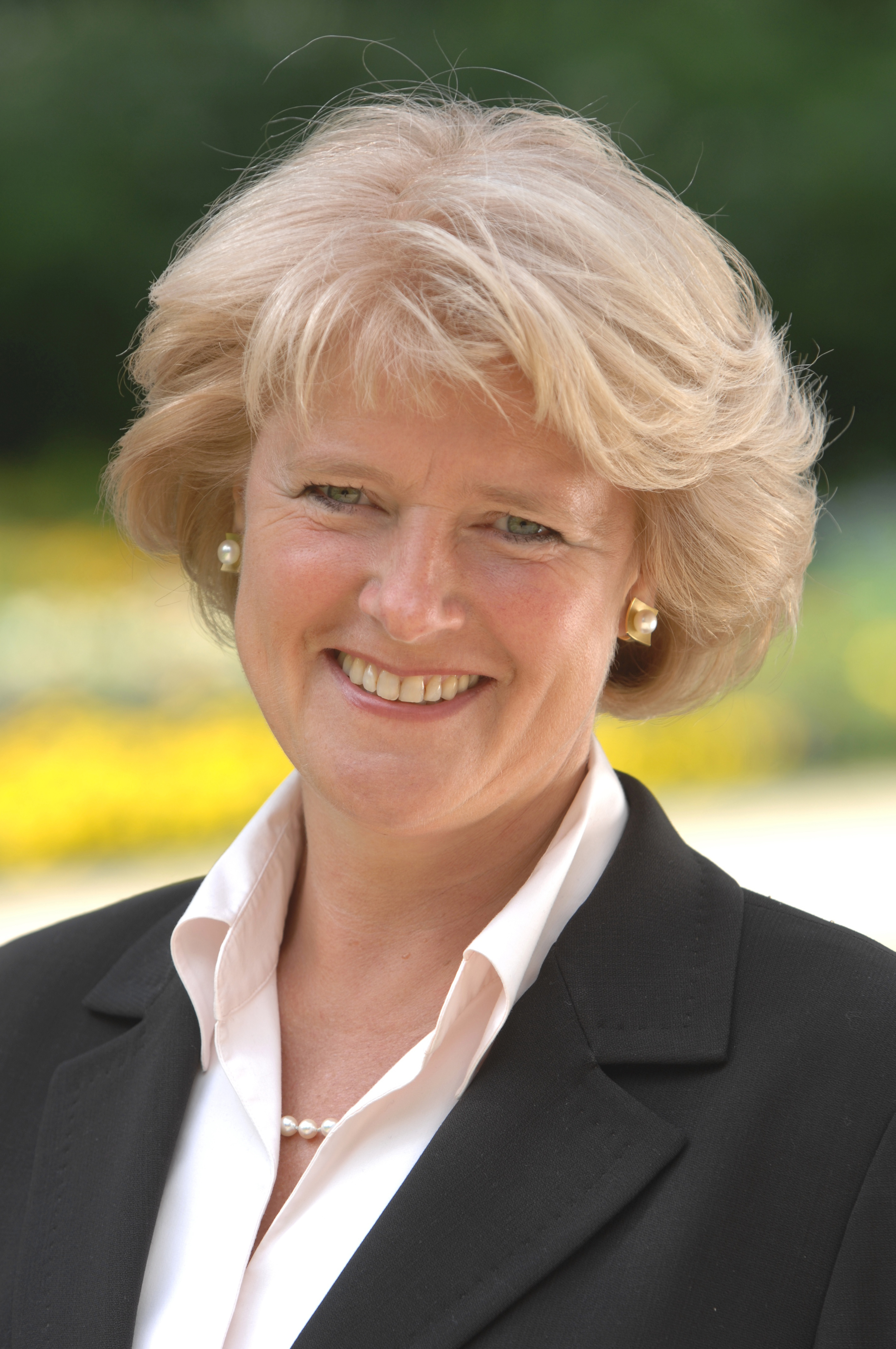
- Grütters in 2009

Federal Commissioner for Culture and the Media
- In office 17 December 2013 – 8 December 2021
- Chancellor: Angela Merkel
- Preceded by: Bernd Neumann
- Succeeded by: Claudia Roth

Leader of the Christian Democratic Union in Berlin
- In office 2 December 2016 – 19 May 2019
- Preceded by: Frank Henkel
- Succeeded by: Kai Wegner

Member of the Bundestag; from Berlin
- In office 18 October 2005 – 25 March 2025
- Preceded by: Multi-member district
- Succeeded by: Marvin Schulz
- Constituency: State list (2005–2021); Berlin-Reinickendorf (2021–2025)

Member of the; Berlin House of Representatives
- In office 22 October 1995 – 18 September 2005
- Preceded by: Elmar Pieroth
- Succeeded by: Britta Teuerle-Lange
- Constituency: Wilmersdorf 3 (1995–1999); Wilmersdorf 2 (1999–2001); Charlottenburg-Wilmersdorf 6 (2001–2005)

Personal details
- Born: 9 January 1962 (age 64) Münster, West Germany
- Party: Christian Democratic Union
- Education: University of Münster; University of Bonn

Monika Grütters (born 9 January 1962) is a German politician of the Christian Democratic Union (CDU) who served as Federal Government Commissioner for Culture and the Media (Staatsministerin für Kultur und Medien) in the government of Chancellor Angela Merkel from 2013 to 2021. She was a member of the German Bundestag from 2005 to 2025, where she served as chairwoman of the Committee on Culture and Media Affairs from 2009 to 2013. Since December 2016, Grütters has also been the chairwoman of the CDU Berlin and an elected member of the CDU Federal Executive Board.

== Education and professional life ==
After graduating from high school in 1981, Monika Grütters studied German language and literature, art history and political science at the University of Münster and at the Rheinische Friedrich-Wilhelms-Universität Bonn from 1982 onward, where she graduated in 1989 as Magister Artium. After having worked in the press and public relations department of the Bonn Opera during her studies from 1987 to 1988, she worked in the same area from 1990 to 1991 at the then Museum for Transportation and Technology in Berlin and from 1991 to 1992 for the publishing house Bouvier. Between 1992 and 1995 Grütters was spokesperson of the Senate Administration for Science and Research (State of Berlin).

From 1991 to 1999, Grütters was a lecturer in cultural management at the Hanns Eisler College of Music in Berlin. Since 1999, Grütters has been holding an honorary professorship at Freie Universität Berlin for the Master's program Arts and Media Administration.

Grütters also worked as a PR officer for the Bankgesellschaft Berlin from 1996. From 1998 to 2013, she was Spokeswoman of the Board of the Brandenburger Tor Foundation. She is a member of the Central Committee of German Catholics and spokeswoman of the committee's "Culture, Education and Media" section since 2013.

== Political career ==
Grütters joined the Young Union in 1978 and the Christian Democratic Union of Germany (CDU) in 1983. Since 1998 she has been a member of the state executive of the CDU Berlin.

Grütters was a member of the Berlin House of Representatives from 1995 to 2005. In this role, she was the spokesperson for science and cultural policy and from 2001 to 2005 also deputy chairwoman of the CDU Parliamentary Group.

=== Member of Parliament (2005–2025) ===
Grütters was a member of the German Bundestag from 2005 to 2025, representing the electoral district of Marzahn-Hellersdorf. She always entered the Bundestag via the regional list of candidates for Berlin and chaired the Committee on Culture and Media Affairs from 2009 to 2013. In addition to her committee assignments, Grütters was a member of the German-Israeli Parliamentary Friendship Group since 2005. In the 2013 federal election, she was again as the CDU's top candidate for Berlin.

Following Frank Henkel's resignation from the position of chairperson to the CDU Berlin on 13 October 2016, Grütters was unanimously nominated by the executive committee and state executive of the CDU Berlin as a candidate for his successor on the following day. At a small party convention of the CDU Berlin on 2 December 2016, Grütters was elected as the new chairwoman with 78.4 percent of the votes.

Additionally, Grütters was elected at the CDU's federal congress in Essen with 70.37 percent as successor to Emine Demirbüken-Wegner in the Executive Board of the CDU and thus in the party's leadership circle around chairwoman Angela Merkel.

=== Federal Government Commissioner for Culture and the Media (2013–2021) ===
On 17 December 2013, Grütters succeeded Bernd Neumann (CDU) as the Federal Government Commissioner for Culture and the Media. She thus holds the title of a Minister of State to the Federal Chancellor and is head of a so-called Supreme Federal Authority (oberste Bundesbehörde) with headquarters in both Berlin and Bonn. Albeit often stated in the press, Grütters did not cover the function of a German "culture minister": according to the German Basic Law, cultural and educational matters are still subject to the sovereignty of the Länder. In the context of cooperative cultural federalism, however, the Federal Government Commissioner is responsible for cultural and media matters of national importance.

During her term of office in the third Merkel cabinet, the overall budget for federal cultural affairs increased by more than 30% up to 1.67 billion within the federal budget between 2013 and 2018. However, issues surrounding the 2012 Munich artworks discovery overshadowed Grütters’s first two years in office. As an institutional response to the discovery of major artworks of unclear provenance and ownership in the private Gurlitt collection, Grütters launched the German Lost Art Foundation (Deutsches Zentrum Kulturgutverluste) in 2015. Also in 2015, Grütters presented an amendment to the German law on the protection of cultural property (Kulturgutschutzgesetz) which has been subject to controversial debates. In addition, Grütters has significant responsibility for the successful state funding of the Barenboim–Said Akademie in Berlin and a national photographic archive in Düsseldorf to preserve, archive and publicise the country's photographic cultural heritage.

In the negotiations to form another coalition government under the leadership of Chancellor Angela Merkel following the 2017 federal elections, Grütters led the working group on cultural affairs and media, alongside Dorothee Bär and Michael Roth. In February 2018, Merkel announced that she would take over Grütters for a second term in her fourth cabinet.

In February 2018, Grütters presided over the CDU's national convention in Berlin.

Amid the COVID-19 pandemic in Germany, Grütters led efforts in 2020 to provide government financial help to cultural institutions and artists whose livelihoods were threatened.

Following her party's defeat in the 2021 elections, Grütters announced her candidacy as Vice President of the Bundestag; however, the CDU/CSU parliamentary group eventually nominated Yvonne Magwas for the position.

In September 2024, Grütters announced that she would not stand in the 2025 federal elections but instead resign from active politics by the end of the parliamentary term.

== Other activities ==
=== Corporate boards ===
- Art and Exhibition Hall of the Federal Republic of Germany, Ex-Officio Member of the Shareholder Meeting
- Humboldt Forum Kultur, Ex-Officio Chairwoman of the Supervisory Board
- Kulturveranstaltungen des Bundes in Berlin (KBB), Ex-Officio Chairwoman of the Supervisory Board (2014–2021)

=== Non-profit organizations ===
- Leibniz Association, Member of the Senate (since 2022)
- German Foundation for Peace Research (DSF), Member of the Board (since 2022)
- Cusanuswerk, Member of the Advisory Board
- Konrad Adenauer Foundation (KAS), Member of the Board of Trustees
- Jewish Museum, Berlin, Chairwoman of the Board of Trustees (since 2014)
- Culture Foundation of the German Football Association (DFB), Deputy Chairwoman of the Board of Trustees
- Foundation Flight, Expulsion, Reconciliation, Chairwoman of the Board of Trustees
- Documentation Center Nazi Party Rally Grounds, Member of the Board of Trustees
- Memorial to the Murdered Jews of Europe Foundation, Member of the Board of Trustees (since 2005)
- Museum Berggruen, Member of the International Council
- Tarabya Academy, Deputy Chairwoman of the Advisory Board
- Deutschlandradio, Ex-Officio Member of the Supervisory Board (2014–2021)
- Foundation for the Humboldt Forum in the Berlin Palace, Ex-Officio Member of the Council (2014–2021)
- Cultural Foundation of the German States (KdL), Member of the Council (2014–2021)
- RIAS Berlin Commission, Ex-Officio Honorary Chairwoman (2014–2021)
- German Historical Museum (DHM), Substitute Member of the Board of Trustees (2009–2013)
- International Journalists’ Programmes (IJP), Ex-Officio Member of the Board of Trustees (2014–2021)
- Association of German Foundations, Member of the Parliamentary Advisory Board (2005–2013)
- Literarisches Colloquium Berlin (LCB), Member of the Board of Trustees (2005–2013)

== Recognition ==
- 2017 – Julius Campe Prize
- 2018 – Ordre des Arts et des Lettres
- 2019 – Order of the Aztec Eagle

== Political positions ==
In June 2017, Grütters voted against her parliamentary group’s majority and in favor of Germany’s introduction of same-sex marriage.

Ahead of the Christian Democrats’ leadership election in 2018, Grütters publicly endorsed Annegret Kramp-Karrenbauer to succeed Angela Merkel as the party’s chair.

In April 2020, Grütters co-signed – alongside around 50 other members of her parliamentary group – a letter to President of the European Commission Ursula von der Leyen which called on the European Union to take in children who were living in migrant camps across Greece.

== Sources and external links ==
Official

- Monika Grütters' website as member of the German Bundestag
- Biography (official website of the Federal government)
