= Ann-Kathrin Biewener =

German politician (born 1990)

Member of the Berlin House of Representatives
- Incumbent
- Assumed office 29 October 2026
- Constituency: Charlottenburg-Wilmersdorf

Personal details
- Born: 1990 (age 35–36)
- Party: Social Democratic Party

Ann-Kathrin Biewener (born 1990) is a German politician serving as a member of the Berlin House of Representatives since 2026. From 2016 to 2026, she was a borough councillor of Charlottenburg-Wilmersdorf.
