= Klara Schedlich =

German politician (born 2000)

Member of the Abgeordnetenhaus of Berlin
- Incumbent
- Assumed office 4 November 2021

Personal details
- Born: Klara Schedlich; 4 January 2000 (age 26) Berlin, Germany
- Party: Alliance 90/The Greens
- Education: Technische Universität Berlin

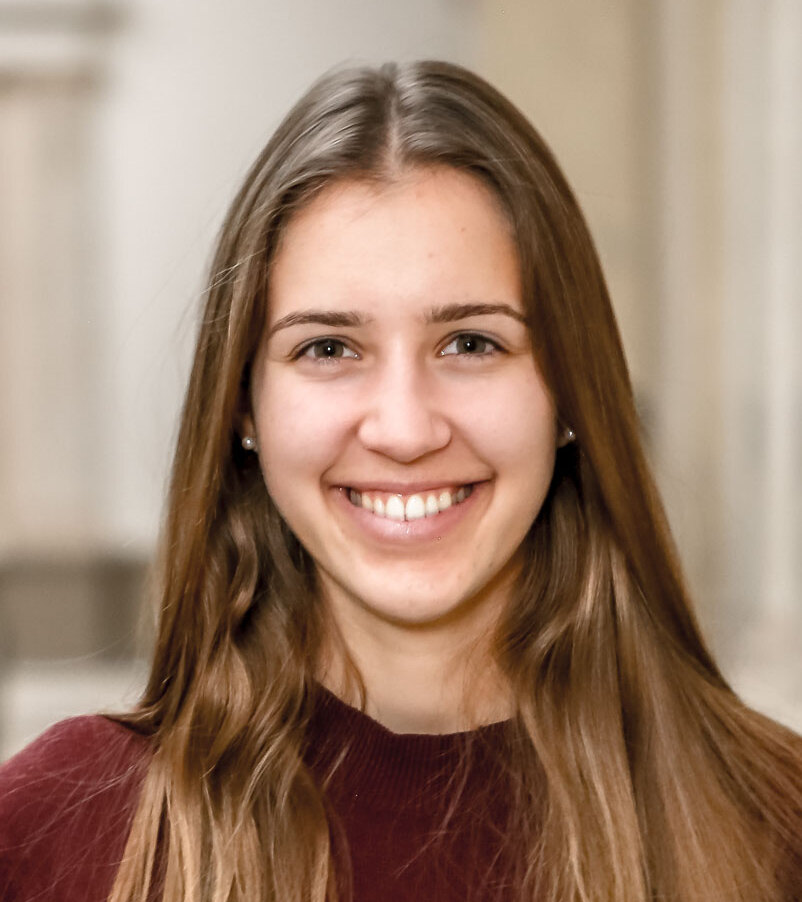
Klara Schedlich

Klara Schedlich (born 4 January 2000) is a German politician of Alliance 90/The Greens who is serving as a member of the Abgeordnetenhaus of Berlin since 2021.

== Life and education ==
Schedlich was born in Berlin in 2000 and grew up in the neighbourhood of Reinickendorf. Her mother and grandmother, Bosiljka Schedlich, are of Croat origin; Schedlich grew up bilingual in both German and Croatian, and describes the latter as her mother tongue. She attended the Victor-Gollancz-Schule in Berlin-Frohnau from the age of five, and passed her Abitur at the age of 17 at the Neues Gymnasium in Glienicke/Nordbahn. After that, she began studying mechanical engineering at Technische Universität Berlin, spending two of her semesters in Zagreb.

== Politics ==
Schedlich joined the Greens in 2017. She became involved with the Green Youth, founding and becoming chairwoman of the Nord local association. In 2018, she was elected to the state executive of the Berlin Green Youth. Within the Greens, she became co-speaker of the state working group on education and co-chair of the Reinickendorf district association.

In 2021, Schedlich was nominated as Greens candidate in the Reinickendorf 6 constituency in the 2021 Berlin state election and seventh place on the state party list. Alongside June Tomiah, she was lead candidate for the Green Youth in the election. She named youth, education, and transport policy as her main areas of concern. At 21 years old, Schedlich was the youngest candidate in the election. During the campaign, the Greens office in Reinickendorf, which Schedlich operates out of, was graffitied with intimidating messages.

Schedlich placed third in Reinickendorf 6, winning 17.9% of votes. She was elected to the Abgeordnetenhaus on the state list and became the youngest member of the parliament. She was elected deputy chair of the Greens parliamentary group and became spokeswoman for youth, vocational training and sport.
