= Sebastian Maack =

German politician (born 1969)

Member of the Bundestag
- Incumbent
- Assumed office March 2025

Personal details
- Born: 1969 (age 56–57)
- Party: Alternative for Germany

Sebastian Maack (born 1969) is a German politician who was elected as a member of the Bundestag in 2025. He previously served as city councillor for public order of Reinickendorf.
