= 2001 Berlin state election =

German state election

- 21 October 2001

All 141 seats of the Abgeordnetenhaus of Berlin 71 seats needed for a majority
- Turnout: 1,623,338 (68.1%) ▲2.6%
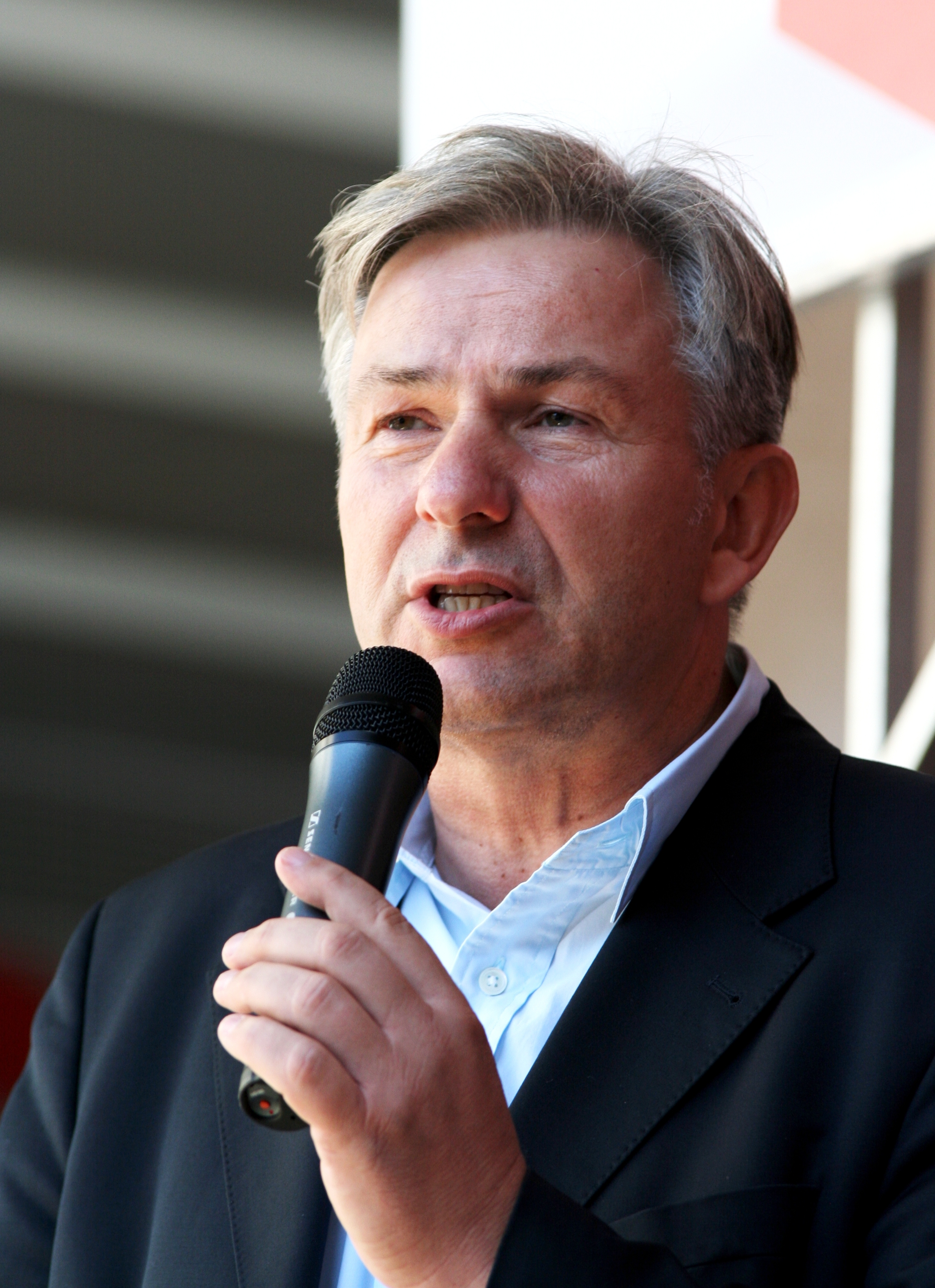

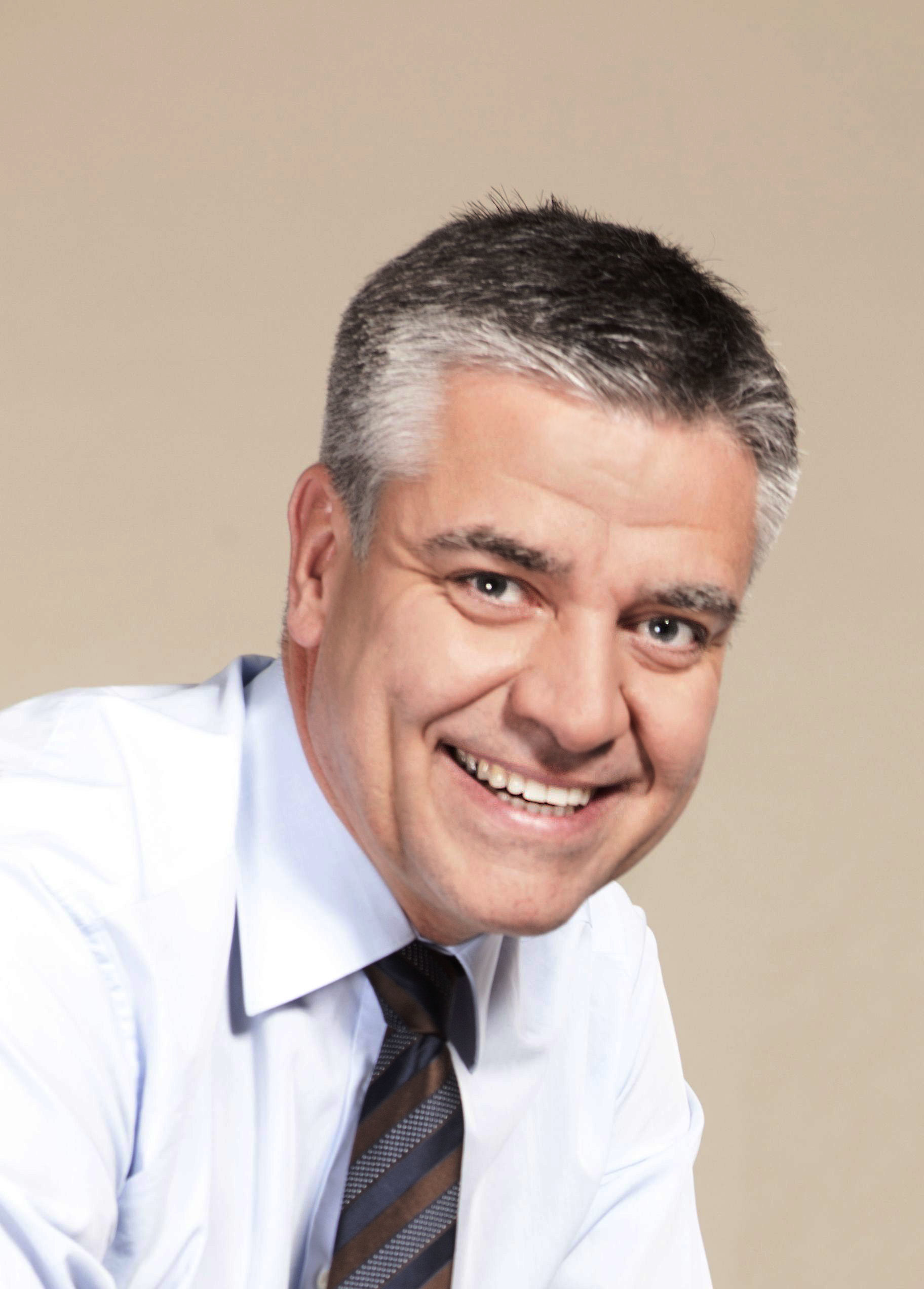

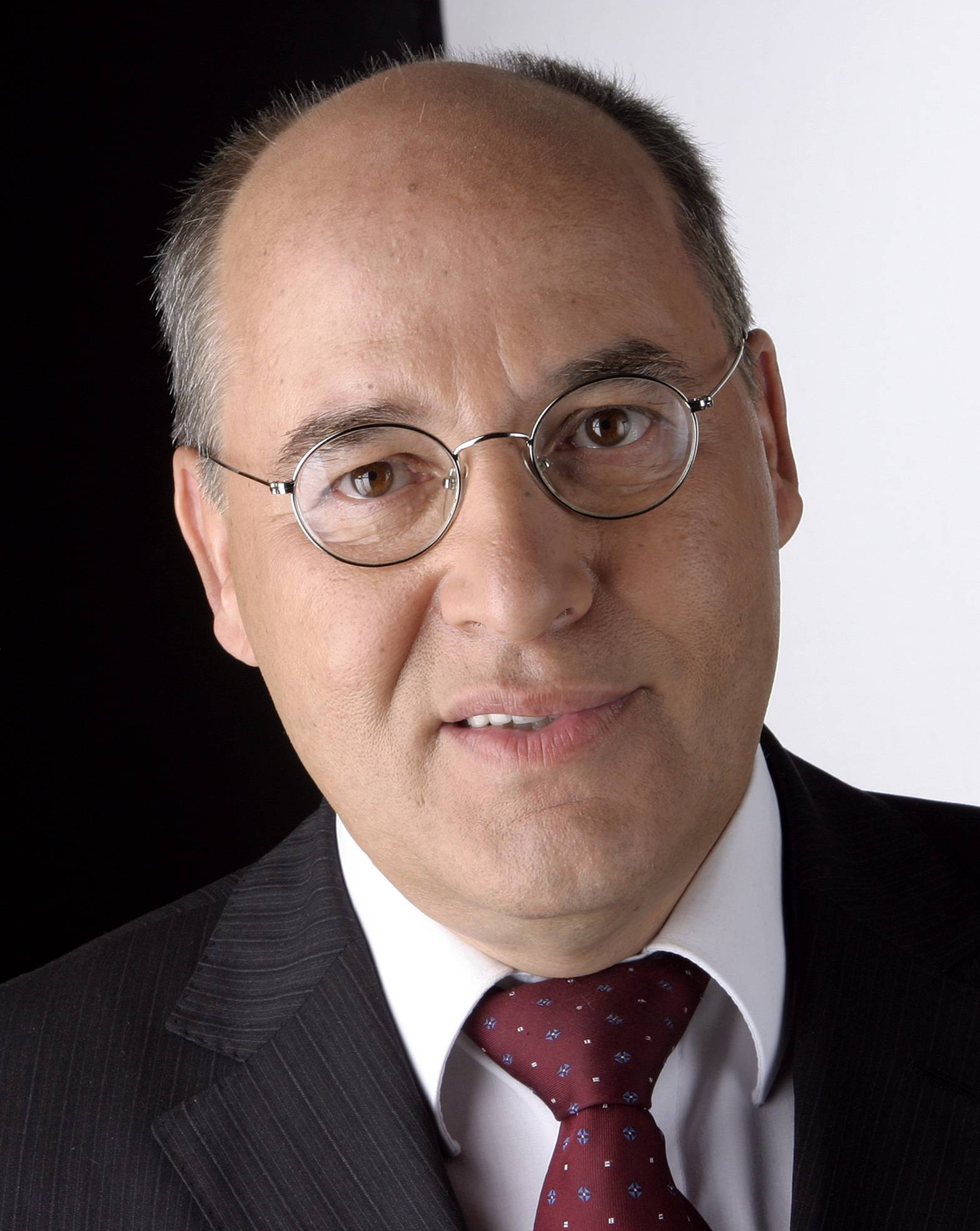

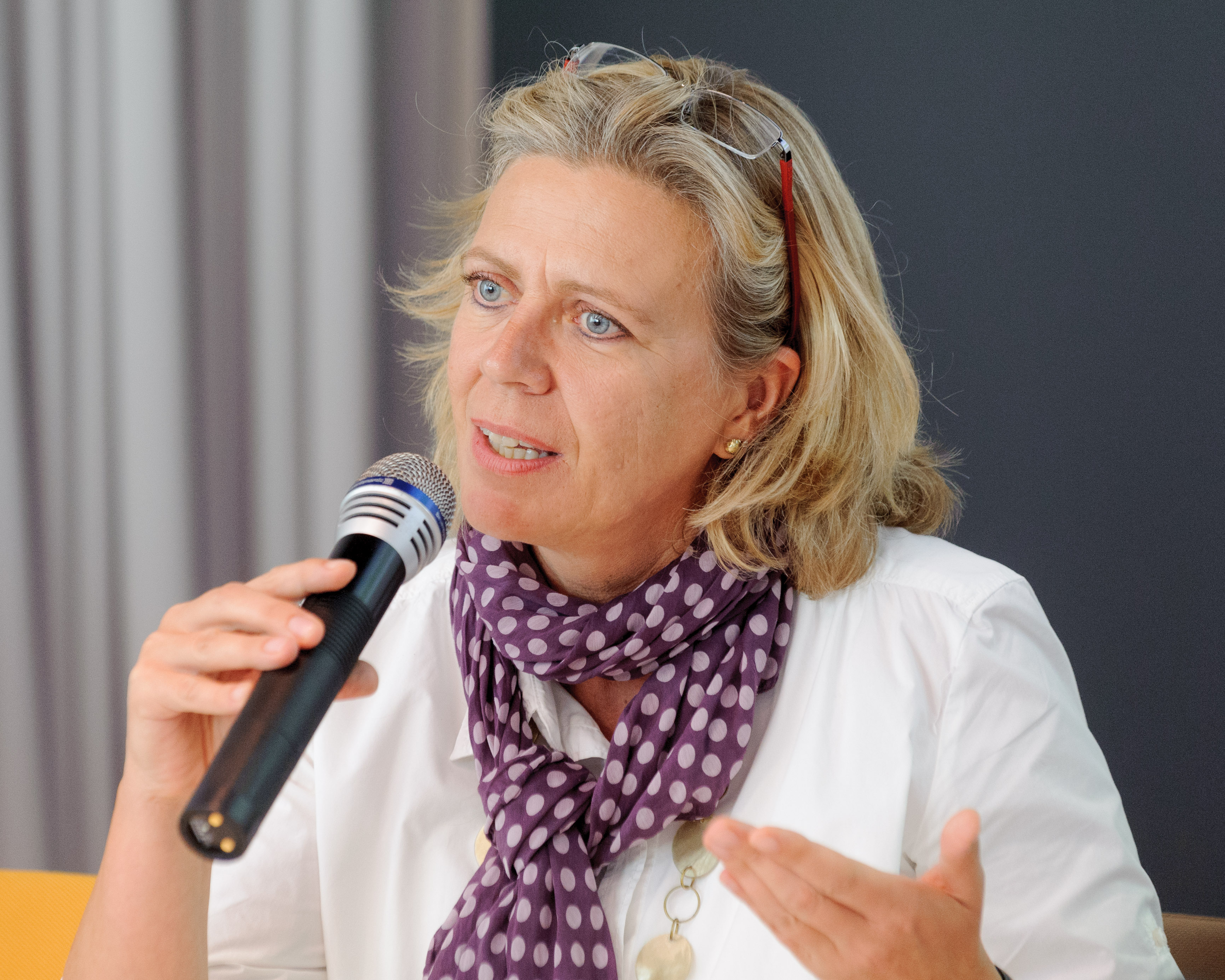
	First party	Second party	Third party
Leader	Klaus Wowereit	Frank Steffel	Gregor Gysi
Party	SPD	CDU	PDS
Last election	42 seats, 22.4%	76 seats, 40.8%	33 seats, 17.7%
Seats won	44	35	33
Seat change	▲2	▼41	0
Popular vote	481,772	385,692	366,292
Percentage	29.7%	23.8%	22.6%
Swing	▲7.3%	▼17.0%	▲4.9%
	Fourth party	Fifth party
Leader	Günter Rexrodt	Sibyll-Anka Klotz
Party	FDP	Greens
Last election	0 seats, 2.2%	18 seats, 9.9%
Seats won	15	14
Seat change	▲15	▼4
Popular vote	160,953	148,066
Percentage	9.9%	9.1%
Swing	▲7.7%	▼0.8%
- Results for single-member constituencies.
Mayor before election
Klaus Wowereit
SPD
Elected Mayor
Klaus Wowereit
SPD

The 2001 Berlin state election was held on 21 October 2001 to elect the members of the 15th Abgeordnetenhaus of Berlin. Prior to the election, Mayor Klaus Wowereit had led a minority government of the Social Democratic Party (SPD) and The Greens since June, which had replaced a coalition between the Christian Democratic Union (CDU) and SPD which collapsed in June.

The SPD–Green government made gains, but remained short of a majority. The SPD first sought to form a traffic light coalition with the Free Democratic Party (FDP) and Greens, but were unsuccessful. They subsequently agreed to a government with the Party of Democratic Socialism (PDS).

The Party of Democratic Socialism (PDS) support would peak in this election with 22.6%.

== Parties ==
The table below lists parties represented in the 14th Abgeordnetenhaus of Berlin.

Name		Ideology	Leader(s)	1999 result	
Name		Ideology	Leader(s)	Votes (%)	Seats
CDU	Christian Democratic Union of Germany; Christlich Demokratische Union Deutschlands	Christian democracy	Frank Steffel	40.8%	76 / 169
SPD	Social Democratic Party of Germany; Sozialdemokratische Partei Deutschlands	Social democracy	Klaus Wowereit	22.4%	42 / 169
PDS	Party of Democratic Socialism; Partei des Demokratischen Sozialismus	Democratic socialism	Gregor Gysi	17.7%	33 / 169
Grüne	Alliance 90/The Greens; Bündnis 90/Die Grünen	Green politics	Sibyll-Anka Klotz	9.9%	18 / 169

== Issues and campaign ==
The 2001 election was an early election. In June 2001, the grand coalition under Mayor Eberhard Diepgen (CDU) broke down following a scandal involving CDU's leader in the Abgeordnetenhaus of Berlin, Klaus-Rüdiger Landowsky. Landowsky, who served as the CEO of a public mortgage bank (later Landesbank Berlin Holding), had financed a risky deal between two men who were donors to the local CDU branch. The Berlin bank scandal cost the city several billion euros. The SPD subsequently left the coalition, which had governed Berlin since 1990, and formed an interim minority government with the Greens supported by the PDS. Klaus Wowereit became Mayor after a constructive vote of no confidence against Diepgen on 15 June. The House of Deputies then voted to dissolve itself, triggering a new election.

The campaign was strongly influenced by the bad state of the public finances and the bank scandal. The CDU nominated 35-year-old Frank Steffel as their top candidate, and played on fears of potential PDS involvement in government. They also focused on security issues, especially after September 11 attacks.

The regional broadcaster Sender Freies Berlin accompanied the election campaign on its website with a "Wahltest" app, marking the first time in Germany that a Voting Advice Application was used.

== Opinion polling ==
Polling firm	Fieldwork date	Sample size	CDU	SPD	PDS	Grüne	FDP	Others	Lead
2001 state election	21 Oct 2001	–	23.8	29.7	22.6	9.1	9.9	5.0	5.9
Infratest dimap	18 Oct 2001	?	25	35	18	9	7	5	10
Infratest dimap	12 Oct 2001	?	25	33	19	10	9	4	8
Forsa	11 Oct 2001	?	26	36	16	10	7	5	10
Forsa	1–4 Oct 2001	993	26	36	15	10	9	4	10
Forsa	4 Oct 2001	?	27	34	15	10	10	4	7
Forsa	27 Sep 2001	?	28	34	16	10	9	3	6
Forsa	6 Sep 2001	?	26	35	17	10	9	3	9
Forsa	4 Aug 2001	?	30	32	17	10	7	4	2
Infratest dimap	20 Jul 2001	?	26	28	21	11	9	5	2
Forsa	1 Jul 2001	?	30	32	18	9	7	4	2
Infratest dimap	22 Jun 2001	?	30	28	22	9	7	4	2
Forsa	13 Jun 2001	1,000	30	30	16	13	7	4	Tie
Emnid	4 Jun 2001	?	33	30	16	10	7	5	3
Forsa	2 Jun 2001	?	31	29	14	14	7	5	2
Infratest dimap	20–26 Sep 2001	1,000	34	29	17	11	4	5	5
Forsa	10 Mar 2001	?	37	28	14	12	3	6	9
Infratest dimap	20–26 Sep 2000	1,000	35	30	17	11	4	3	5
Emnid	23 Sep 2000	?	37	33	4	18	5	3	4
Forsa	17 Apr 2000	?	39	25	15	12	3	6	14
1999 state election	10 Oct 1999	–	40.8	22.4	17.7	9.9	2.2	7.0	18.4

== Election result ==
Summary of the 21 October 2001 election results for the Abgeordnetenhaus of Berlin
Party	Votes	%	+/–	Seats	+/–
Social Democratic Party (SPD)	481,772	29.68	+7.3	44	+2
Christian Democratic Union (CDU)	385,692	23.76	-17.0	35	-41
Party of Democratic Socialism (PDS)	366,292	22.56	+4.9	33	±0
Free Democratic Party (FDP)	160,953	9.91	+7.7	15	+15
Alliance 90/The Greens (Grüne)	148,066	9.12	-0.8	14	-4
The Grays – Gray Panthers (Graue)	22,093	1.36	+0.3	0	±0
The Republicans (REP)	21,836	1.35	-1.4	0	±0
Others	36,634	2.26		0	±0
Total	1,623,338	100.00	–	141	–

Popular Vote
SPD	29.68%
CDU	23.76%
PDS	22.56%
FDP	9.91%
B'90/GRÜNE	9.12%
Other	4.96%

Abgeordnetenhaus seats
SPD	31.21%
CDU	24.83%
PDS	23.40%
FDP	10.64%
B'90/GRÜNE	9.93%

	SPD	CDU/CSU	PDS	Grüne	FDP	Others
West Berlin	33.7	30.8	6.9	11.1	12.8	4.7
East Berlin	23.2	12.4	47.6	5.9	5.3	5.6

== Sources ==
- The Federal Returning Officer (in English)
- Archived "Wahltest" Voting Advice Application for the Berlin State Elections 2001 used in SFB Election Website (in German)
