= Sibyll-Anka Klotz =

German politician (born 1961)

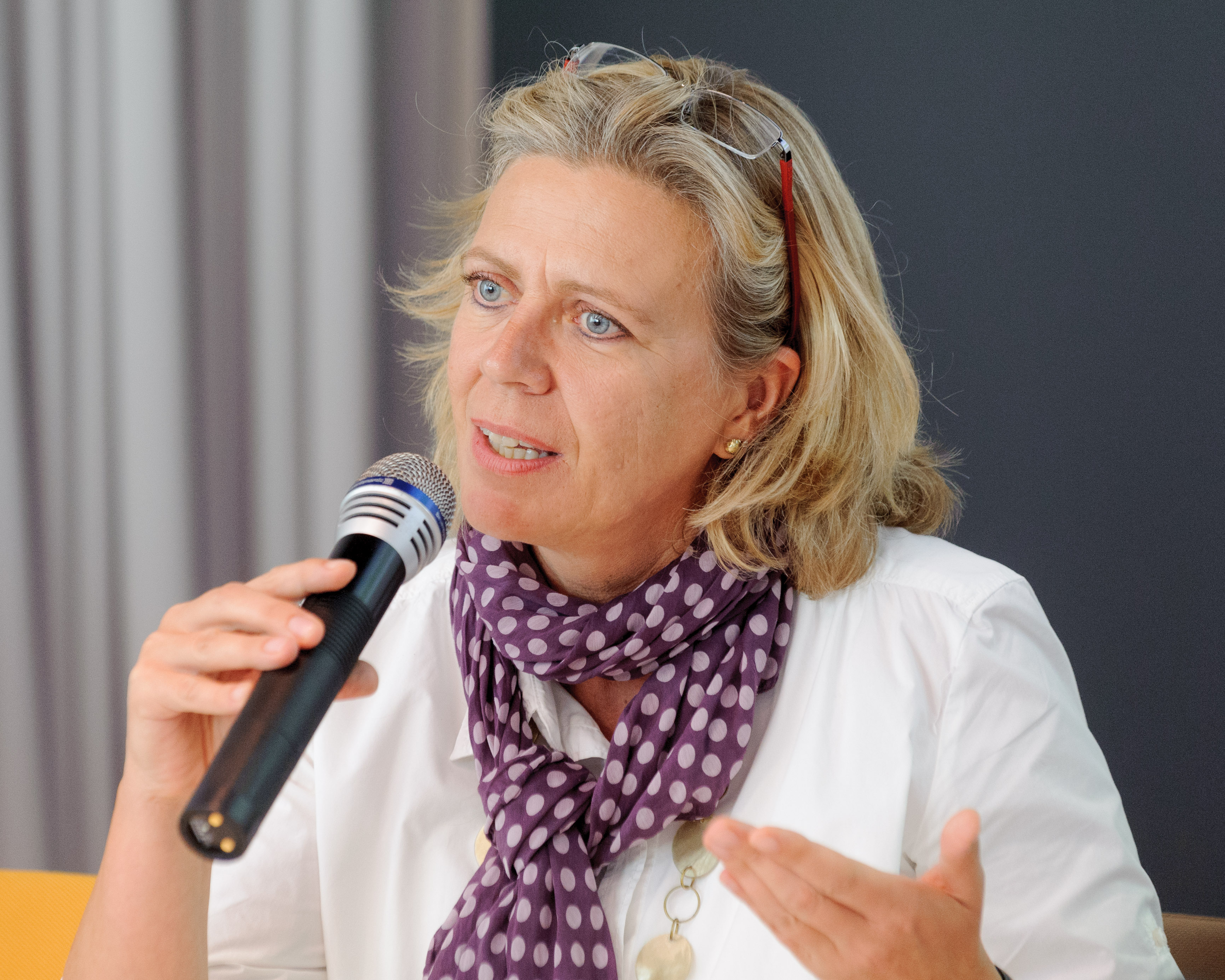
Sibyll-Anka Klotz (2012)

Sibyll-Anka Klotz (born 1961, Berlin) is a German politician and member of Alliance '90/The Greens in the parliament of Berlin.

Klotz studied philosophy at the Humboldt University of Berlin in Berlin.

Since 1991, Klotz has beena member of the parliament in Berlin until 2006. Klotz lives with her daughter, and she lives openly as a lesbian.
