= Karlsplatz =

Town square in Vienna

Coordinates: 48°11′57″N 16°22′12″E

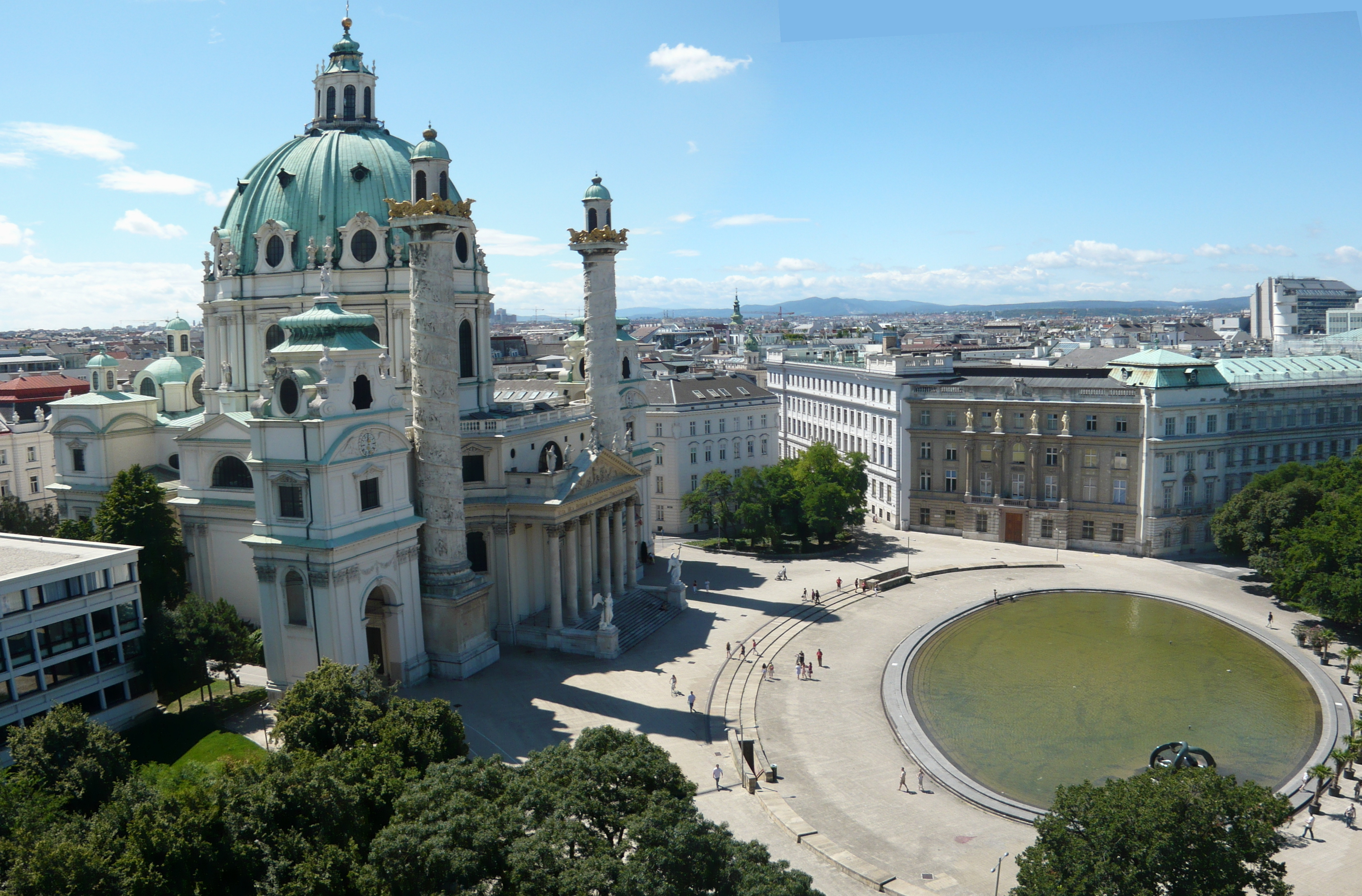
Karlskirche on Karlsplatz, Vienna.

Karlsplatz (German for 'Charles Square') is a town square on the border of the first and fourth districts of Vienna, Austria. It is one of the most frequented and best connected transportation hubs in Vienna. The Karlskirche is located here.

The first district can be reached either by subway (Karlsplatz station) or via Operngasse (a street). The pavilions of the former Karlsplatz Stadtbahn Station remain despite the construction of the U-Bahn system.

== Architecture ==
The largest area of the square on the south side, Resselpark, is named after the inventor Josef Ressel. To the east is the Karlskirche, located in front of a water pool with a sculpture by Henry Moore with the building of the Vienna Museum (formerly the Historical Museum of Vienna) and the Winterthur Insurance building. On the west side of it is the main building of the Technische Universität Wien (Vienna Technical University) and the Protestant school. In Resselpark, monuments and busts are of famous people such as the inventor Siegfried Marcus and Josef Madersperger, as well as the composer Johannes Brahms. On the north side of the Otto Wagner in Art Nouveau style building erected inclusion of the former station Karlsplatz the Vienna Stadtbahn.

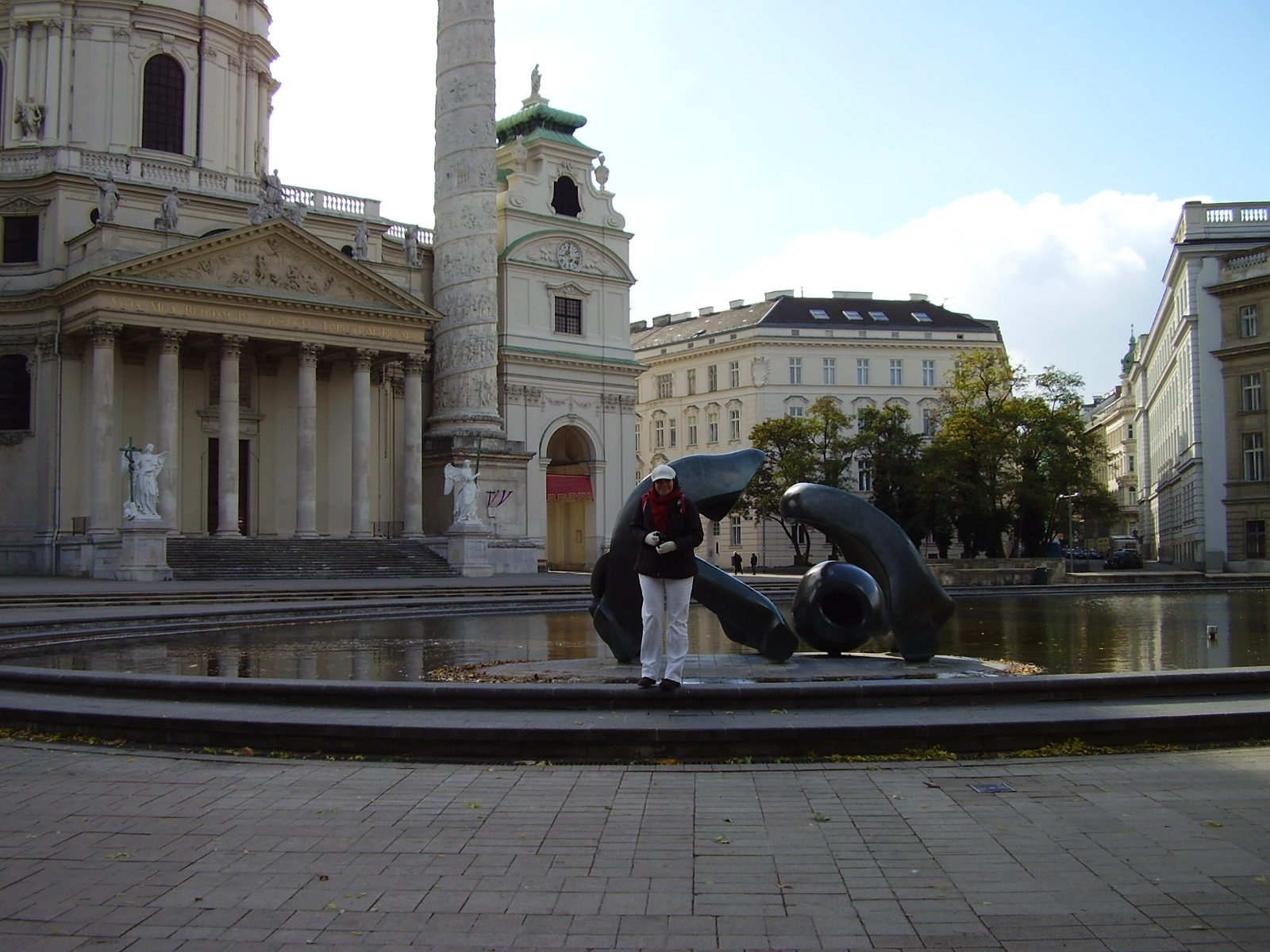
Square in front of the Karlskirche

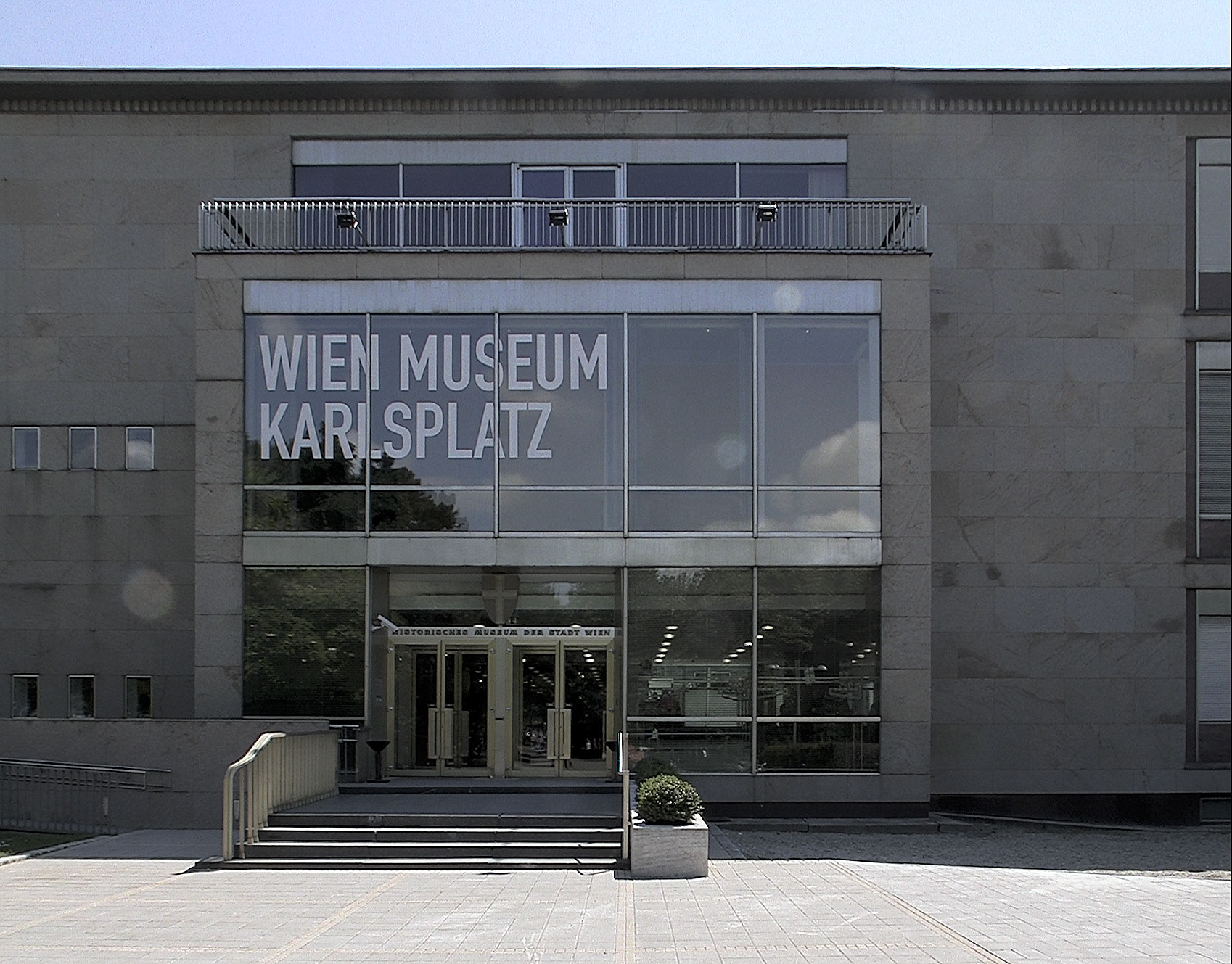
Wien Museum

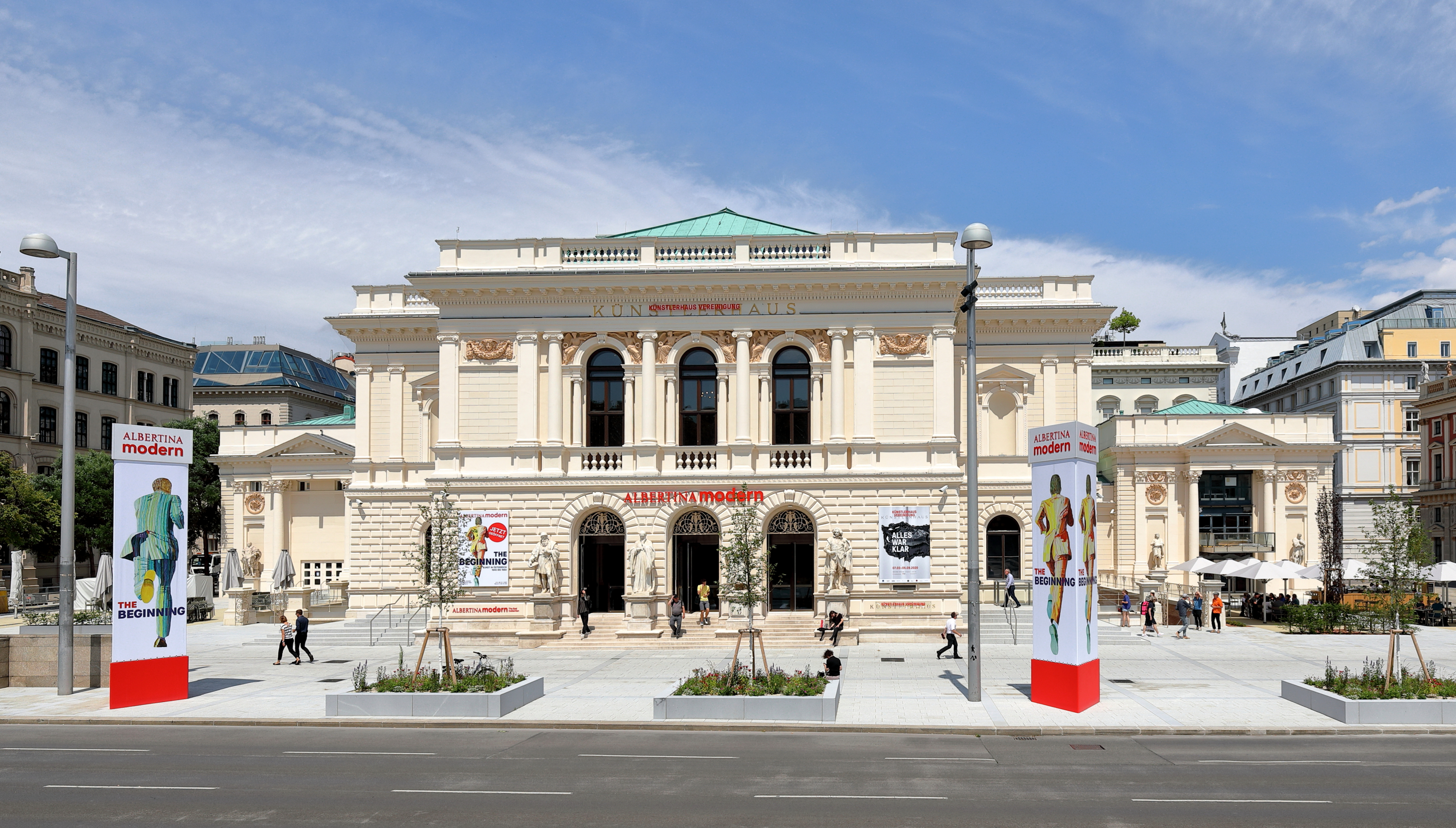
Künstlerhaus

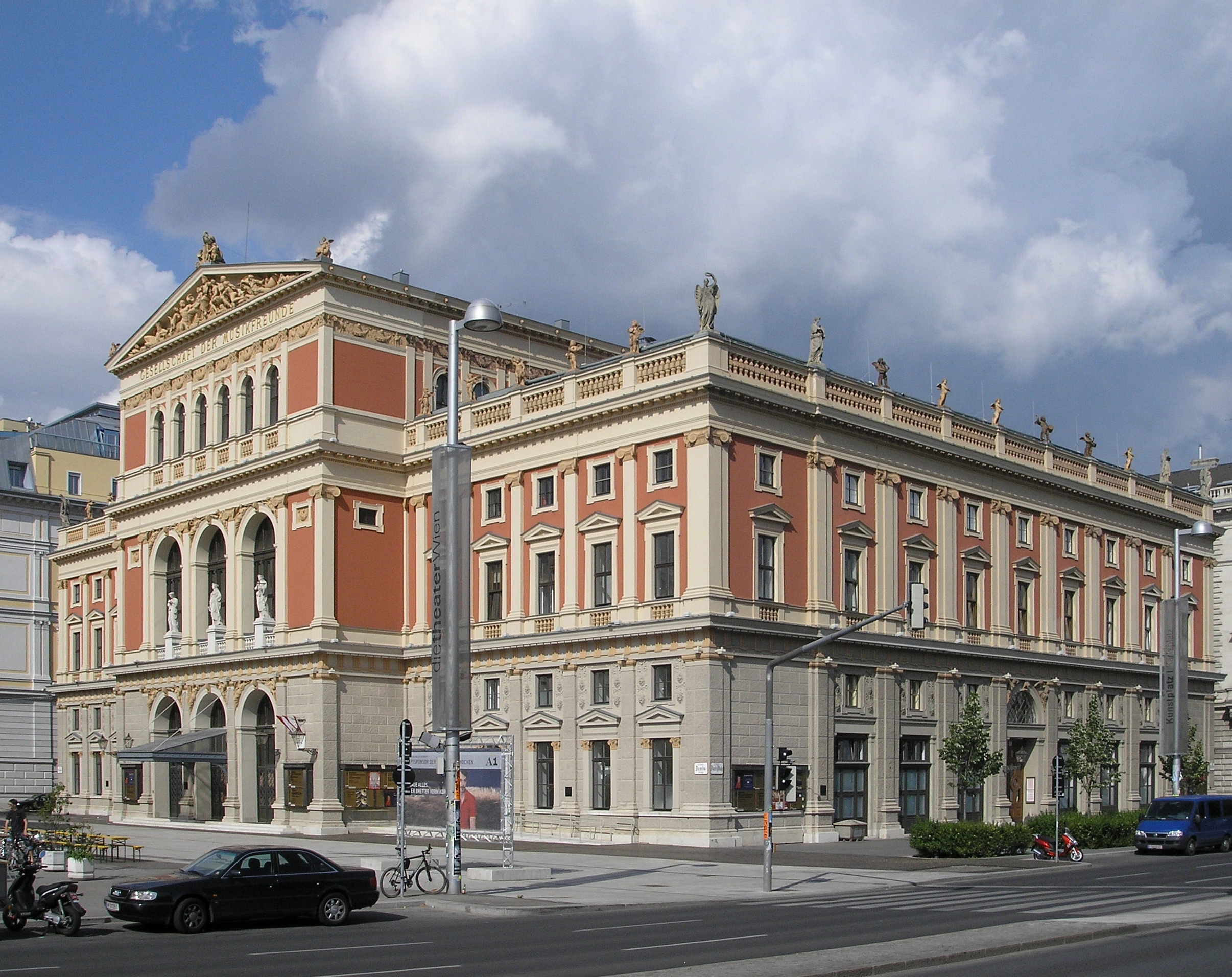
Wiener Musikverein

Separated from the plaza to the north are the buildings of the Wiener Musikverein (Vienna Music Society), the Künstlerhaus (art house), and the Handelsakademie (business school). A Video of the plaza and an eventlist are available on the Website of the association karlsplatz.org Verein zur Förderung d. kulturellen Belebung öffentlicher Räume .

In the west limit the Secession and the Novomatic Forum (formerly the Office Building), the place that here in the area of the Naschmarkt passes. Near the library building of the University consists Rosa Mayreder Park with the project space Karlsplatz a branch of the Kunsthalle Wien.

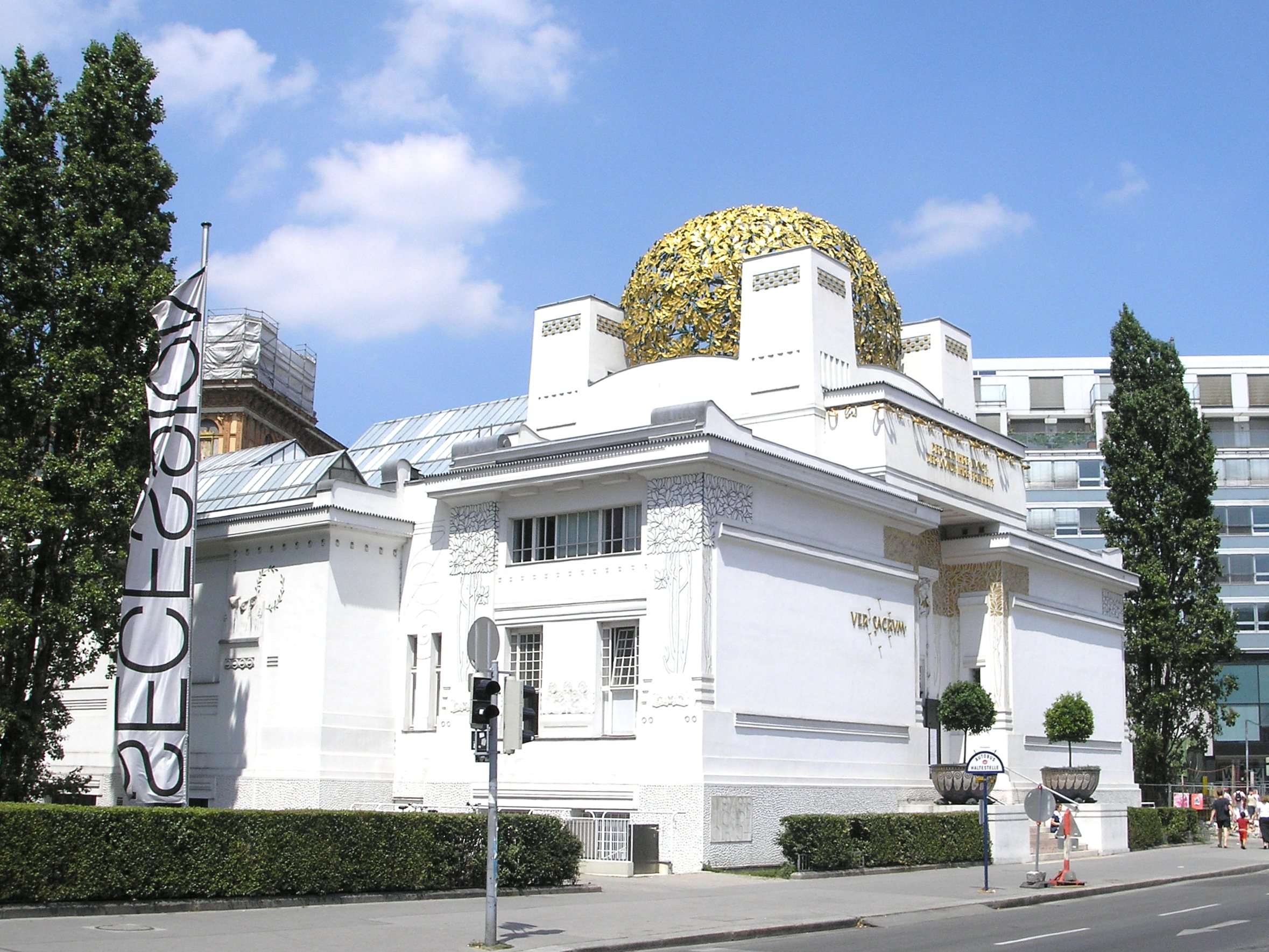
Wiener Secessions-gebäude

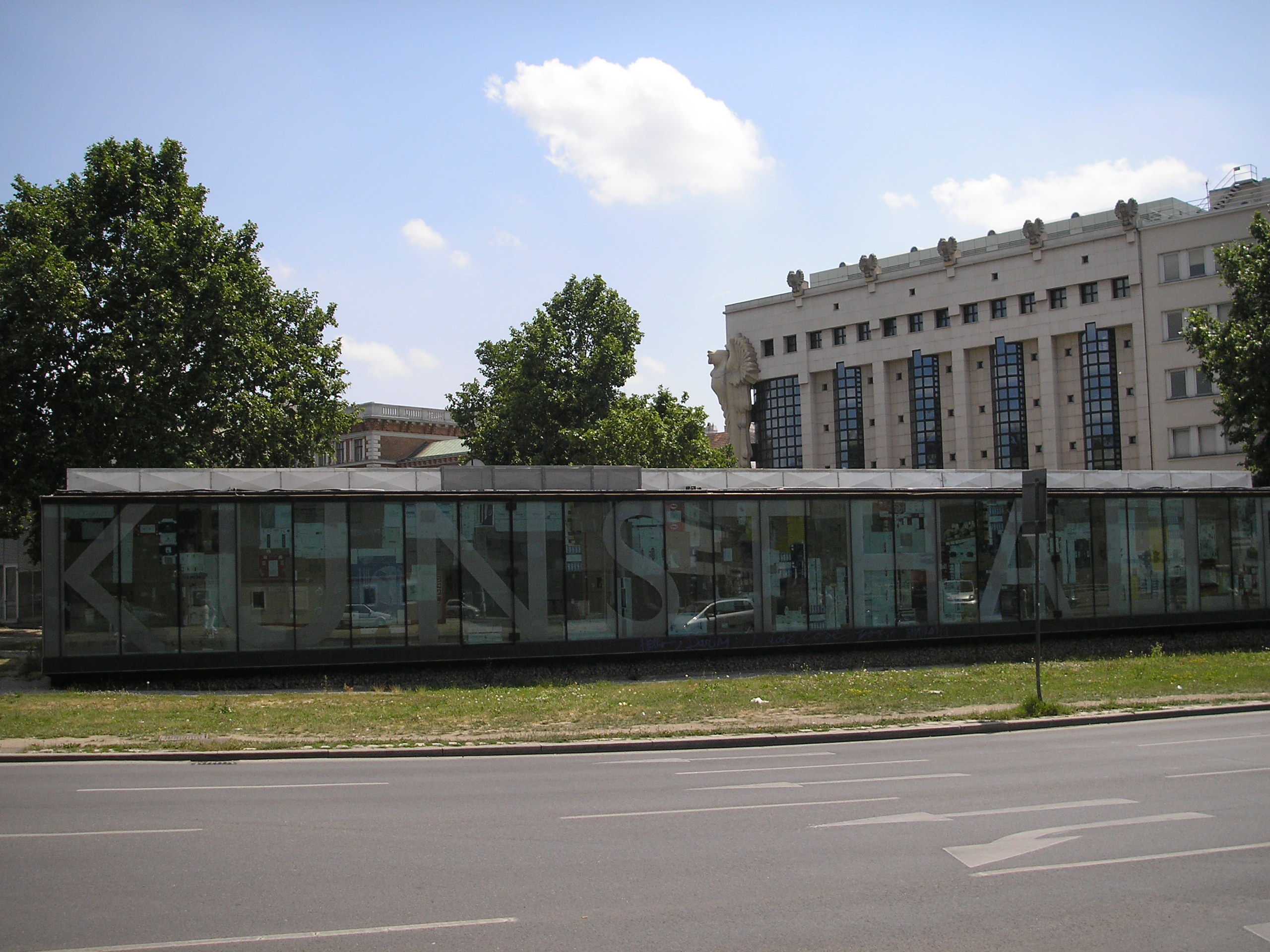
Kunsthalle Wien

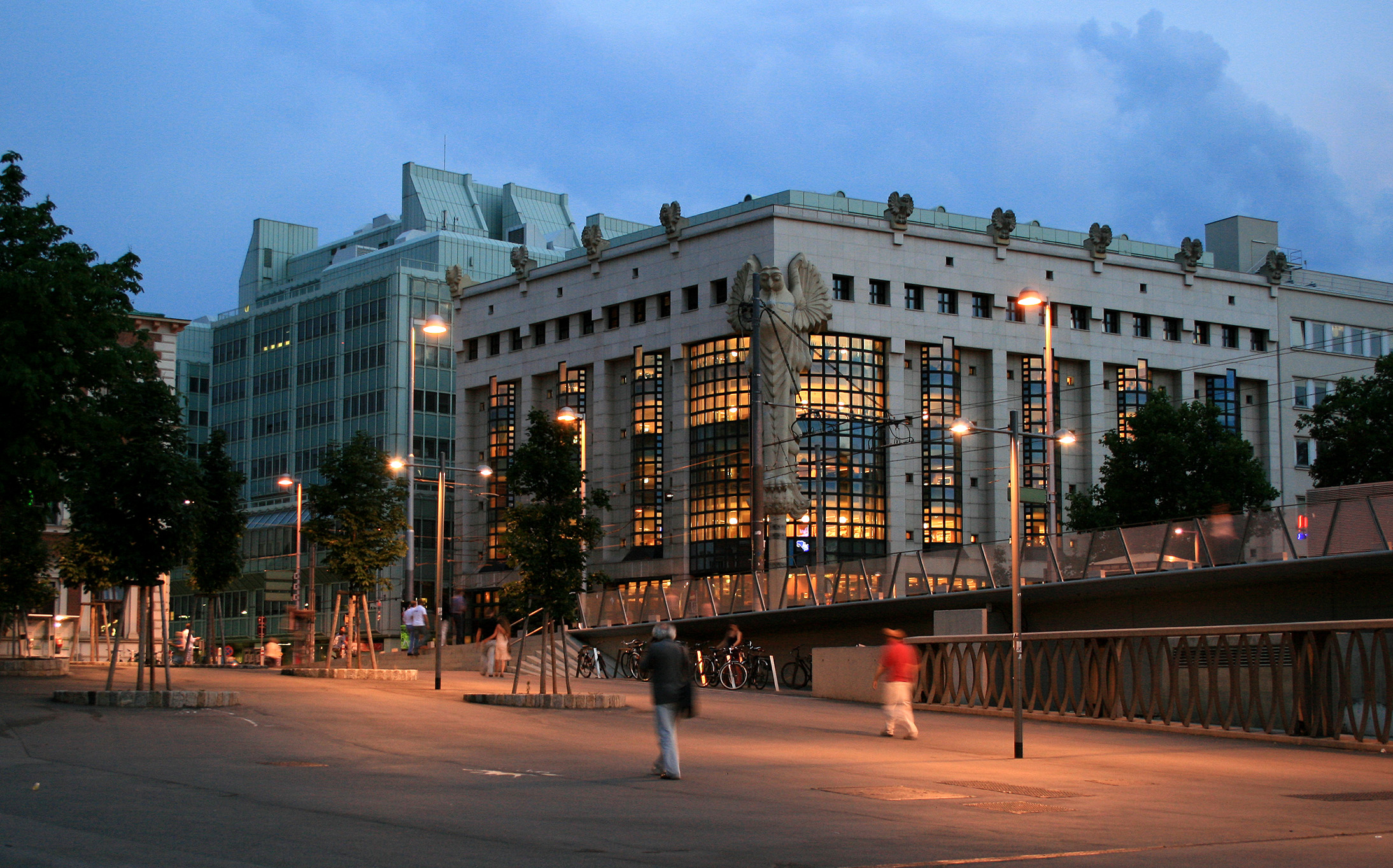
TU Wien Library

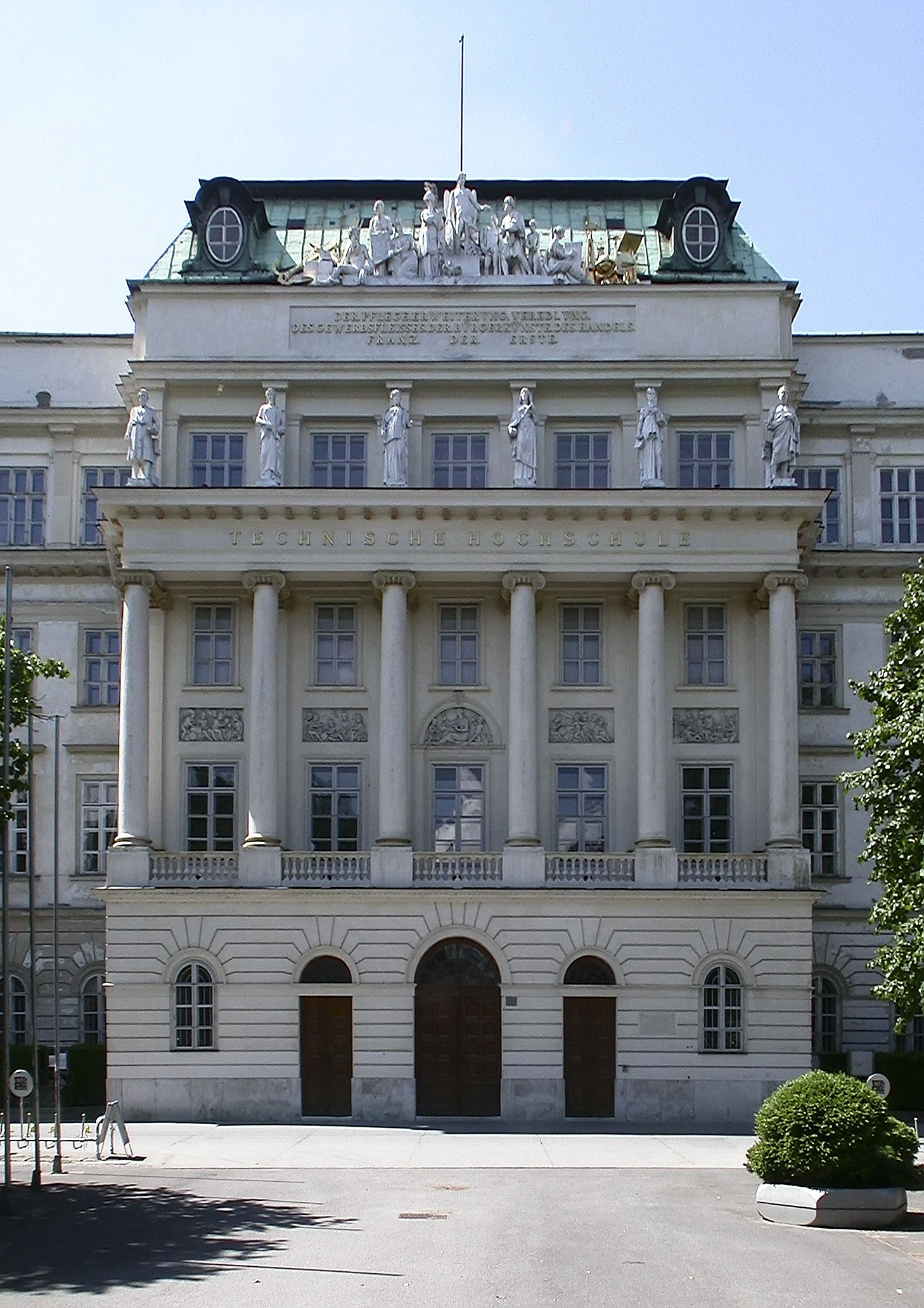
TU Wien, Hauptgebäude

== Traffic ==
Karlsplatz is one of the most important traffic-points of the city, five different traffic flows form a node here:

- the Vienna line (B1), the so-called "West Exit" or "west entrance" to the western suburbs early Western Highway.
- The 2-line, coming from the north and northwest.
- Operngasse and Kärntnerstraße to ring road in the State Opera as a connection to the Northeast.
- Lorraine on the road (B1) to Schwarzenbergplatz and on to the Danube Canal in the Urania as a connection to the East.
- Operngasse and Margaret Street in the south of the city and the southern suburbs motorway.

== Planning ==
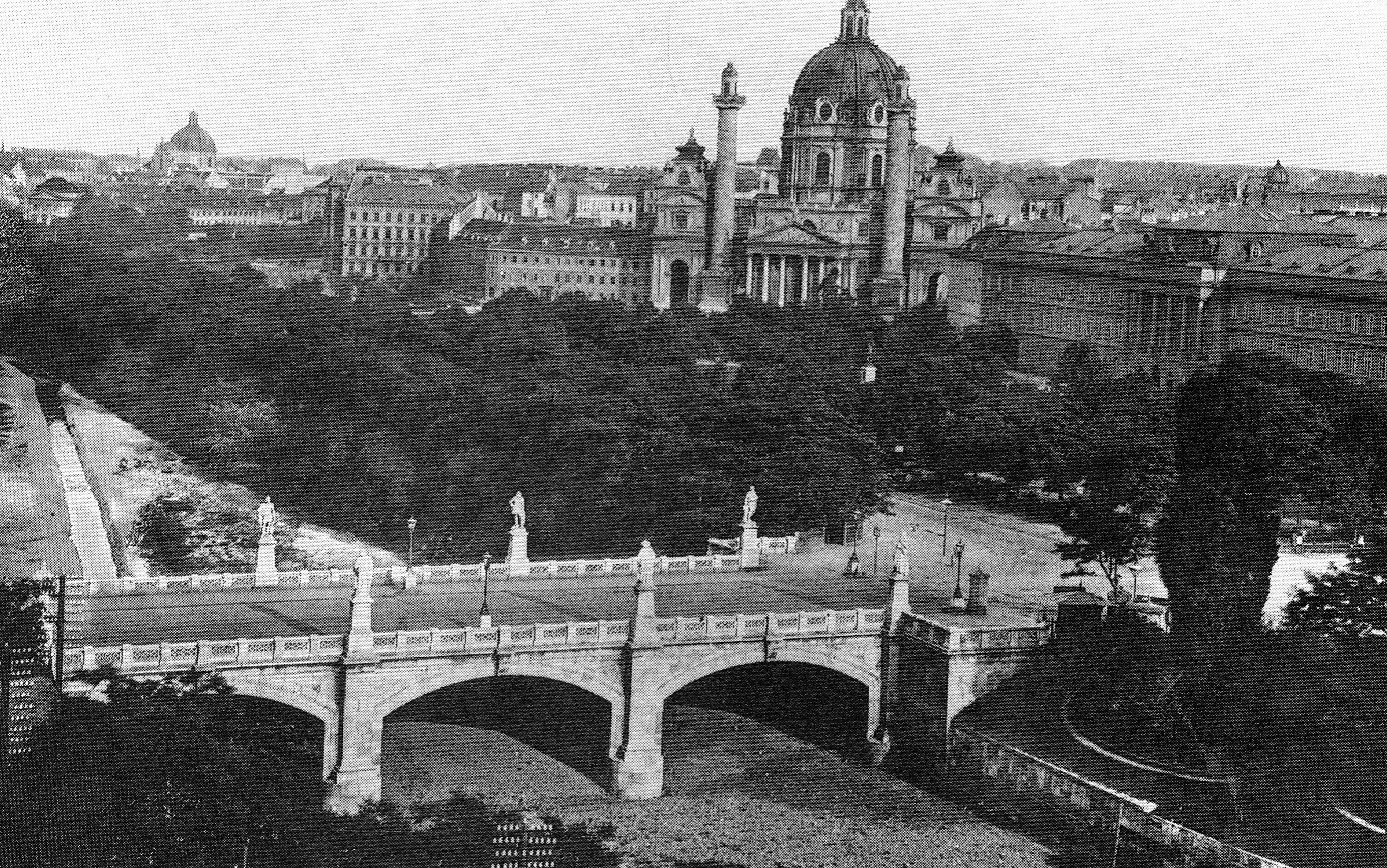
Elisabethbrücke in 1895

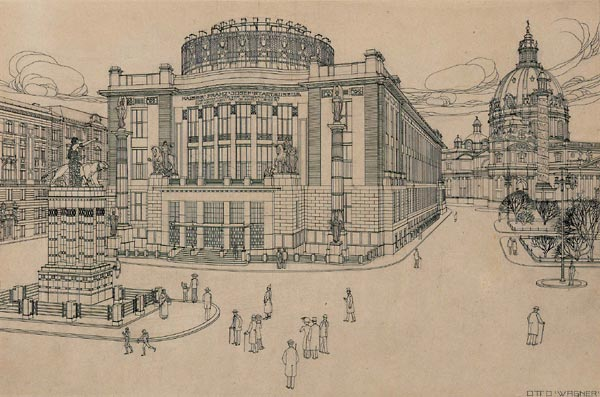
Otto Wagner's design for the redevelopment of the Karlsplatz and the establishment of Emperor Franz Joseph City Museum, now home of the Vienna Museum (1909)

Before the Karlsplatz was built, there was the decorative Elizabeth Era bridge, built in 1854 and named after the young bride of the Emperor ("Sisi"). The bridge was fitted in 1867 with still images, which now presides over the City Hall stand. On 20 April 1897, it was blocked and subsequently demolished.

Following this, the rescheduling of the bridging of the Vienna River caused long square and fitted with new landmark buildings. On 7 May 1901 the city council established an architectural competition over the new design.

In the spring of 1903, two dimensional models made and publicly displayed by Otto Wagner to the mayor Karl Lueger. In a press conference on 3 November 1907, he praised Wagner's project, but spoke out against the nature of the Post Office Savings Bank. He then mobilized Princess Pauline Metternich's conservative members of the nobility against the project, the petition within a short 6000 signatures of support received. In January 1910, it came at the Karlsplatz still drawing up a facade segment in Wagner's original size. After the death of Lueger's council decided on 14 July 1911, the establishment of the City Museum on the design – but ultimately this did not come about.

In the interwar period occurred on the Karlsplatz mainly temporary buildings (such as a shopping center on the site of today's Vienna Museum), after 1945 was dominated by considerations of transport planning (although it did not come to the by George Lippert other and proposed elevated highway solutions). Karlsplatz architectural competitions in question were 1946, 1966, 1969 (relating to underground construction), 1971 (relating to the Garden Making). The realized design with the Swedish garden architect Sven Ingvar Anderson designed oval pond encountered 1976–77 sharpest criticism – Clemens Holzmeister appeared as "shocked" over the water surface in front of the Karlskirche, the media spoke of the "chaos space". Notwithstanding this very negative press echos the acceptance of significantly increased green space Resselpark (and their pond) today. In the course of 2006 by Jakob Fina redesigned planting of greenery of the Karlsplatz were the Esperanto Park and Park Girardi created.

== Arts and culture ==
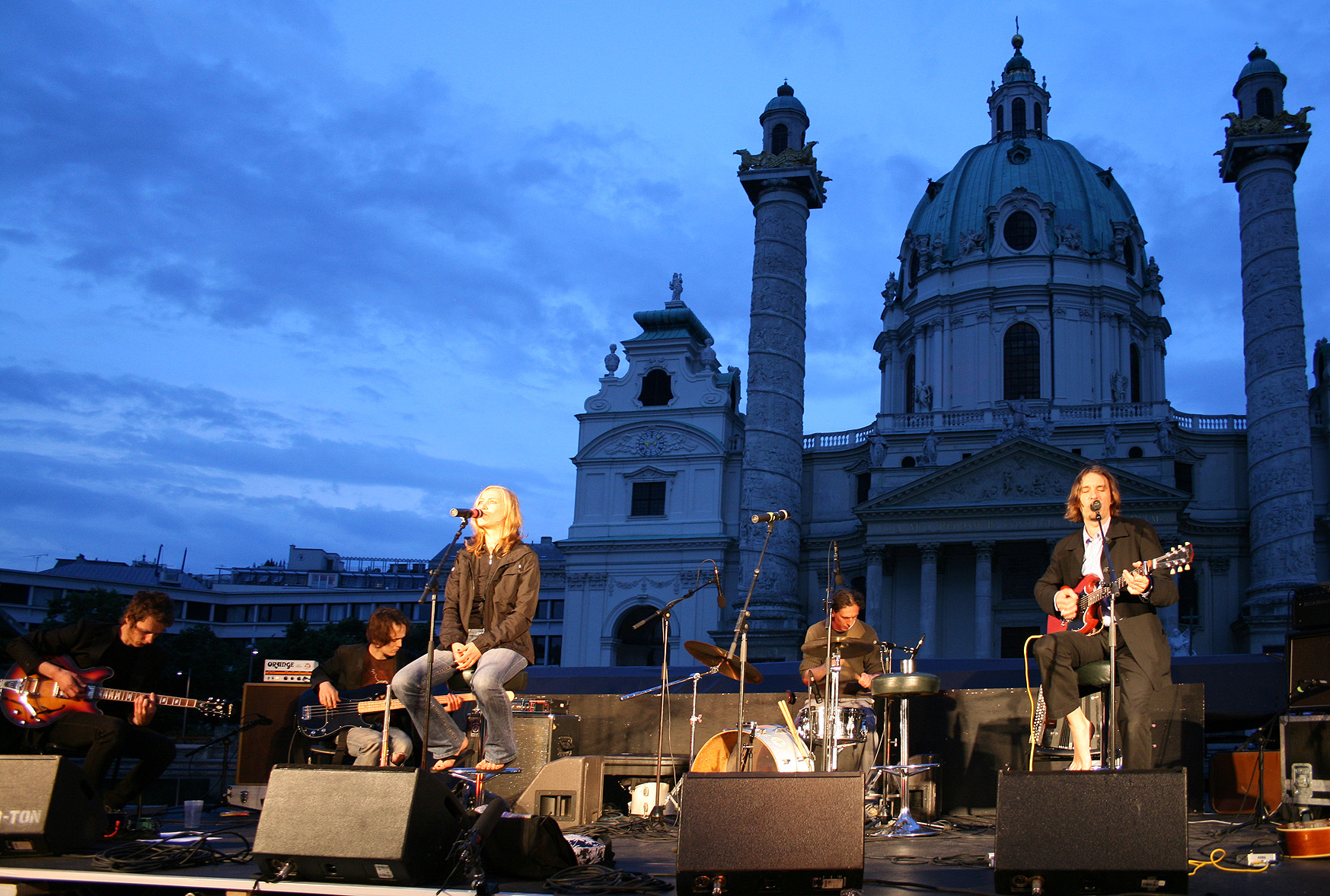
Ernst Molden & Band performing at the Kunstzone Karlsplatz in 2008

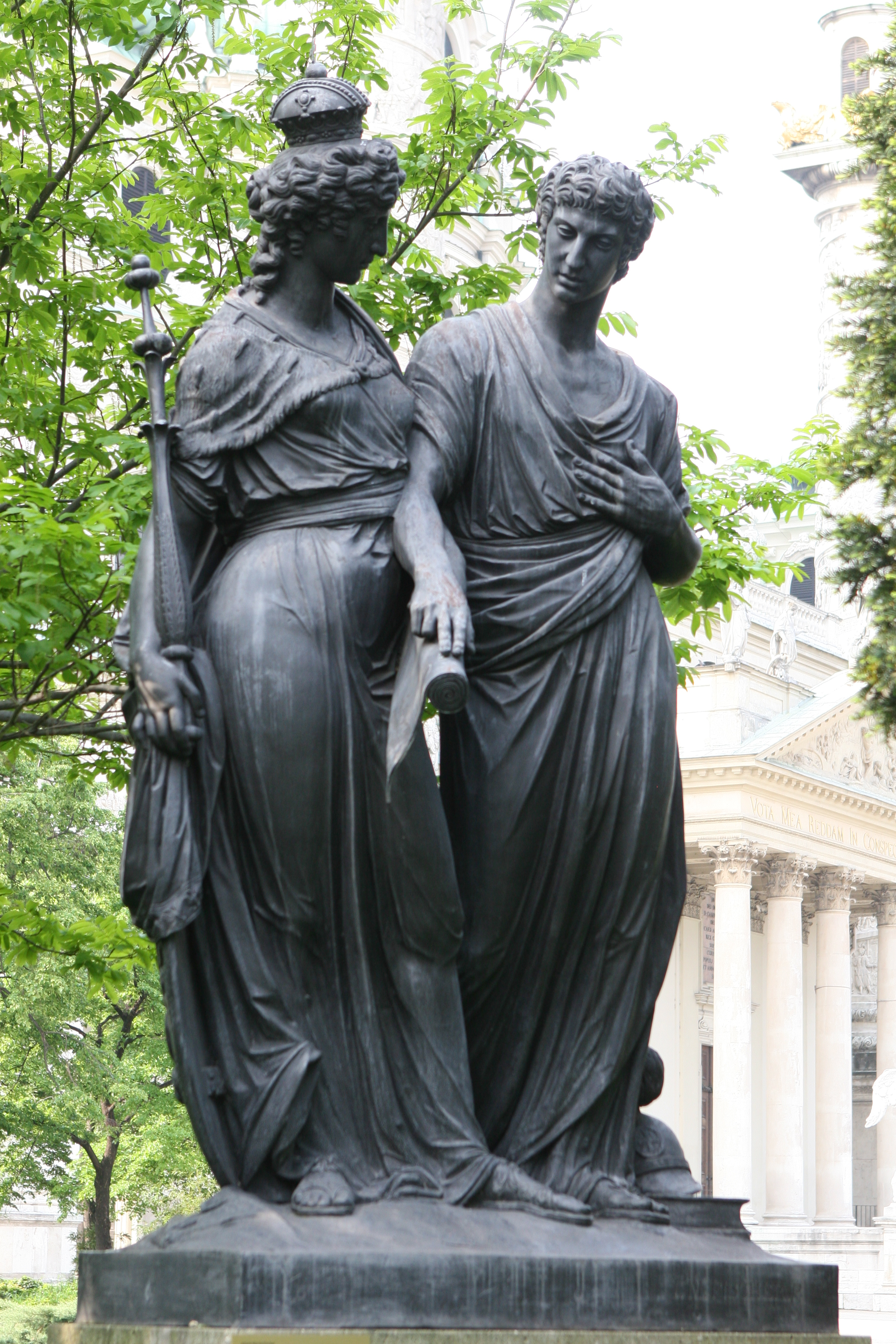
"The Loyalty of the Austrian Nation" at the Karlsplatz

In 2004, representatives of the Municipality of Vienna, presented the project "Karlsplatz Art Space Presented". The goals were, among other things a redesign of the park in terms of gardening, light and space and routing concept, called an improvement of the traffic situation for pedestrians and cyclists and the promotion of art projects on the Karlsplatz.

Following the redesign of the park and the opening of Rosa Mayreder, Girardi and Esperanto Park in 2006, Vienna Holding commissioned a 100% subsidiary of Vienna, with the continuation of the project. On 1 August 2006, the project group karlsplatz.org consisting of Gabriela Hegedüs and Christoph Möderndorfer that since 2004 the organization of literary festivals sound bites in the Museum Quarter are responsible, and Peter Melichar, also implementing. It is through networking of the various surround the square settled institutions in the fields of arts, culture and education (among other things, House of Artists, the project space of the Kunsthalle, Vienna Museum, University of Technology) of the space into an area of cultural exchange, and thus, despite the traffic-technically difficult able to be revived.

On the Karlsplatz the exhibition of the United Buddy Bears was shown in 2006. The exhibition was opened by Christiane Hörbiger, Film actress and UNICEF Ambassador, together with Michael Häupl, Mayor of Vienna and Karin Schubert, Mayor of Berlin.

In the summer of 2008, parallel to the 2008 European Football Championship in Austria and Switzerland was, of karlsplatz.org the Karlsplatz Art Zone aligned. On a "floating stage" in the pond in front of the Karlskirche took it daily for several concerts, especially Austrian musicians from the area of the singer-songwriter, the more experimental pop and contemporary Viennese song instead scene, on a "tree stage" performances by performance artists. Since 2010, takes place on the premises in Karlsplatz and some surrounding institutions at the beginning of the summer open-air season, the multi-day Popfest place.

=== Drug culture ===
In Austria itself, the word "Karlsplatz" is a synonym for an open drug scene. For this reason, there was the first police-monitored protection zone for the Security Police Act (SPG) was established.
