= Manon Kahle =

American actress (born 1980)

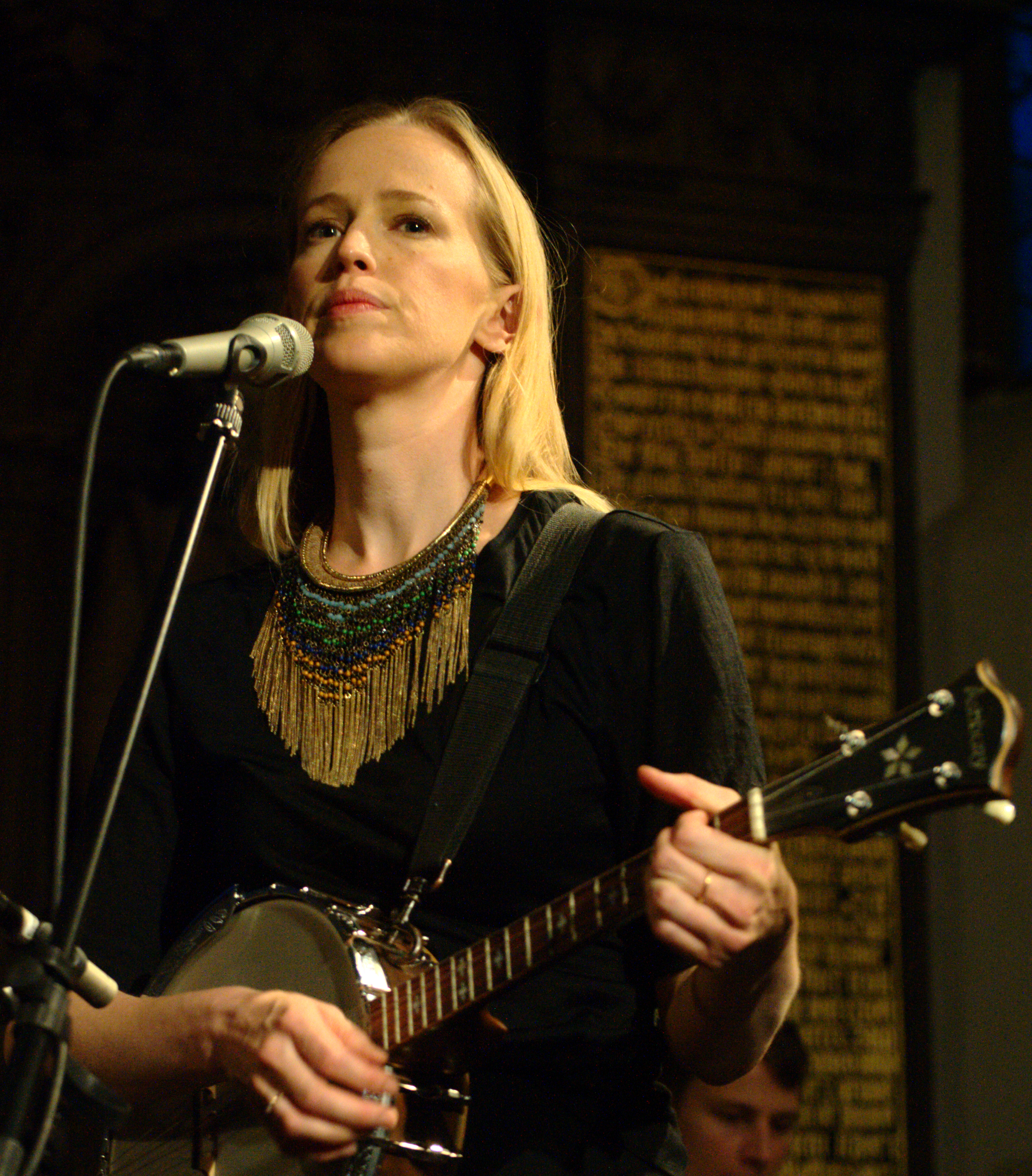

Manon Kahle (born August 10, 1980 in Vermont, USA) is an American actress. She lives and works in Berlin, Germany as an actress, voice-over artist and illustrator.

Kahle earned her BA (Bachelor of Arts) in Theater and French between 1998 and 2002 at Smith College in Northampton, Massachusetts, USA.

== Other ==
Kahle illustrated the German children's book Die Buddy Bären und der schneeweisse Elefant (literally English: The Buddy Bears and the Snow-White Elephant), written by Klaus Herlitz.
