= Strobl (surname) =

Strobl is a surname. Notable people with the surname include:

- Alajos Stróbl (1856–1926), Hungarian sculptor and artist
- Claudia Strobl (born 1965), Austrian skier
- Fritz Strobl (born 1972), Austrian skier
- Gabriel Strobl (1846–1925), Austrian priest and entomologist
- Heinz Strobl, Austrian musician
- Josef Strobl (born 1974), Austrian skier
- Karl Hans Strobl (1877–1946), Austrian novelist
- Michael Strobl (born 1977), American military officer
- Roman Strobl (born 1951), Austrian sculptor
- Thomas Strobl, German politician, chairman of CDU Baden-Württemberg
- Tobias Strobl (born 1990), German footballer
- Tony Strobl (1915–1991), American comics artist and animator
- Zsigmond Kisfaludi Strobl (1884–1975), Hungarian sculptor
