= Buddy Bear Help =

Buddy Bear Help is a children's aid organisation founded in Berlin in 2004 by Eva Herlitz together with several international artists. "Every cent for the children" - with this motto Buddy Bear Help e.V. guarantees that 100 per cent of the donations and auction revenues from charity activities is used for the selected children's projects. All organisational and administrative costs are borne by the club members.

== History ==
Furat al Jamil, an artist from Iraq, who designed the bears for her country for the United Buddy Bears project, wanted to help, with the support of Buddy Bär Berlin GmbH, a five-year-old boy in Baghdad who had a tumor behind his eye and the surgical removal of which was not possible in Baghdad. The boy was to be brought to Berlin for the surgery. Since funds were not immediately available, the help offered came too late.

In order to be able to help quicker, in a more targeted and bureaucratic manner, the Buddy Bear Help organisation was founded in 2004. To send a political message at the time of the Iraq War, one of the founding members of the club was Marsha Coats (wife of U.S. Ambassador to Germany from 2001 - 2005, Daniel R. Coats).

== Help for Children in Need ==
Since 2004, children in need (Kindern in Not) have been helped worldwide. Among other things, the financing of heart surgeries for children in La Paz (Bolivia) was secured, a school project for Maasai in Tanzania was implemented, in 2009 the construction of a school for AIDS orphans in Tepa Tepa, a small village near Lake Malawi, was completed. In other school projects, individual children in Jamaica and Sri Lanka as well as several schools in Nigeria were supported.

The organisation Die Arche has been steadily supported by the activities of Buddy Bär since 2003. Since 2009, Die Arche has also been supported by Buddy Bear Help, with the organisation carrying the costs of rent for the new Arche location in Berlin-Wedding. Yet the organisation also wants to enable schoolchildren in Berlin to put themselves into the shoes of children who are less fortunate.
