= Roman Strobl =

Austrian sculptor (born 1951)

Roman Johann Strobl (born May, 12, 1951 in Kitzbühel) is an Austrian sculptor. He has lived in Hanover since 1999.

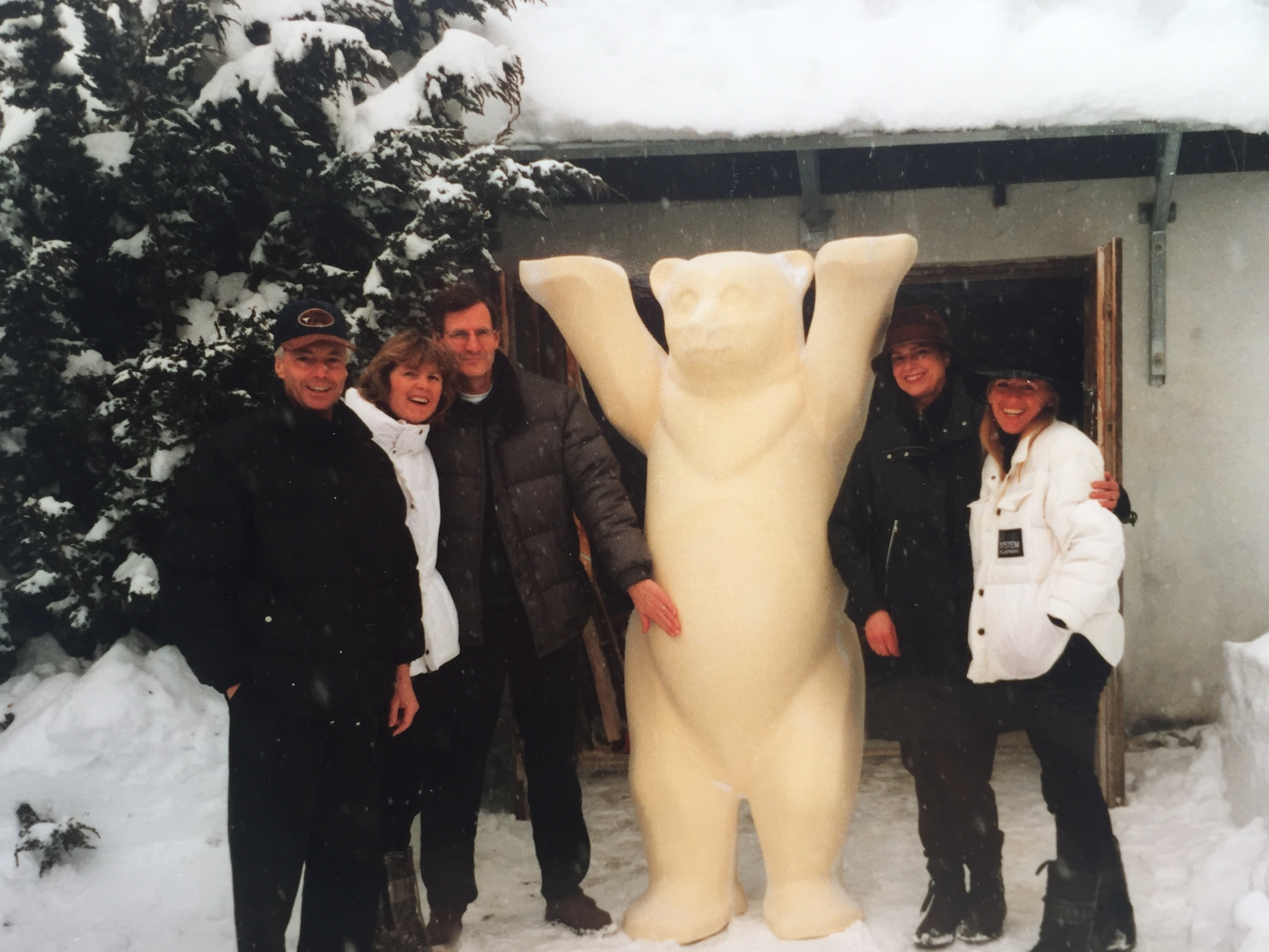
The Buddy Bear designed by Roman Strobl, Ellmau, January 2001

Strobl learnt to sculpt in his father's workshop. Surrealist works inspired by his travels during the 1970s in Iraq and India were followed by a spell in Rome, during the 1980s, where he honed his skills in marble working under Prof. Sebastian Schadhauser. Strobl's marble sculptures were exhibited in 1986 in the Haus der Kunst, in 1990 at Kubus Bremen, and other venues.

His first chainsaw works were presented in 1998, in Schloß Kaps in Kitzbühel. Chainsaw portraits of Bruno Bruni at an exhibition in Ahrensburg, in 2001, as well as Gerhard Schröder and Franz Beckenbauer, at the 2002 Expo in Hanover were to follow. One further work worthy of mention is his portrait of conductor Zubin Mehta, created for the opening of the Munich opera festival, in 2005.

In addition to sculptures in wood, marble, and stone, Strobl's oeuvre also takes in a series of highly expressive picture cycles on canvas, as well as drawings. He has presented his sculptures publicly at venues in Zurich, Munich, Hanover and in Austria (Kunst am Bau – architectural sculpture).

Together with Mechthild Schmidt, Strobl was responsible in 1997 for the redesign of the German film award, the Lola. In 2001 he and his wife, Anne, created the prototype for the Buddy Bear, working closely together with Eva and Klaus Herlitz.

Pictures and sculptures by Strobl were exhibited for the first time in Paris, at La capitale Galerie, in 2007.
