= George Lippert =

American politician (1844–1906)

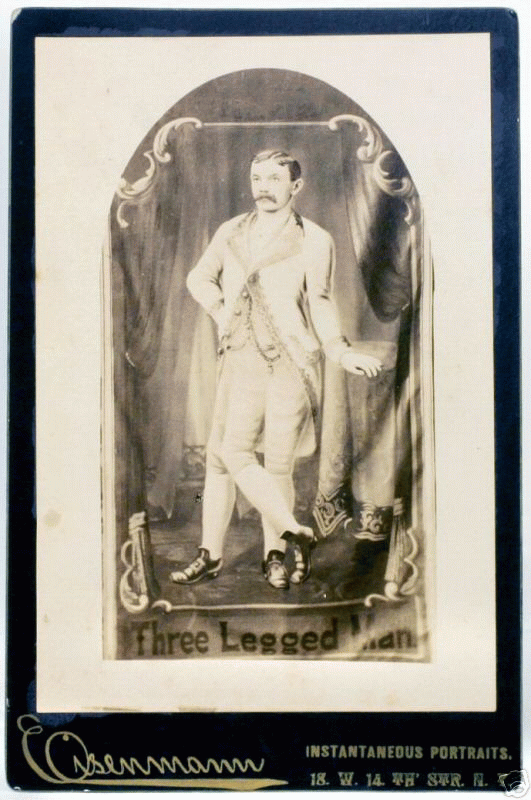
Lippert's "pitch card", with Eisenmann's photograph

George Lippert (1844, Bavaria – July 1906, Salem, Oregon), was born with three legs and, as was discovered during his autopsy, two hearts.

== Career ==
At about 33 years old, Lippert emigrated from Bavaria to the United States in about 1877, beginning a sideshow career that lasted nearly 30 years. He exhibited with P. T. Barnum, where he was promoted as the "Only Three-Legged Man on Earth" and later as the "Original Three-Legged Man".

After exhibiting for more than two decades, Lippert faced competition in 1898 from the younger Frank Lentini, whose performances with the Ringling Brothers Circus attracted widespread attention. By 1899, at about 55 years old, Lippert had retired from exhibition and was living in poverty in Salem, Oregon, where local florist Mary Riggs provided him with a home and financial support during the final years of his life.

== Medical condition ==
Lippert was born with a rare congenital condition that gave him three legs. His third leg extended from the right side of his body and ended in a foot with six toes, giving him a total of 16 toes. During his career, he claimed that the extra leg had once been fully functional but became unusable after it was broken in an accident. Contemporary descriptions indicate that the limb hung motionless while he was exhibited.

Following Lippert's death in 1906, the Daily Capital Journal reported that an autopsy found he had two hearts. The claim was later repeated in secondary sources.

== Death ==
He died of tuberculosis in 1906.

== Legacy ==
The Ronald G. Becker Collection of Charles Eisenmann Photographs, held by Syracuse University, includes a photograph of a painting titled "George Lippert three legged man".
