= Klaus and Eva Herlitz =

German businesspeople

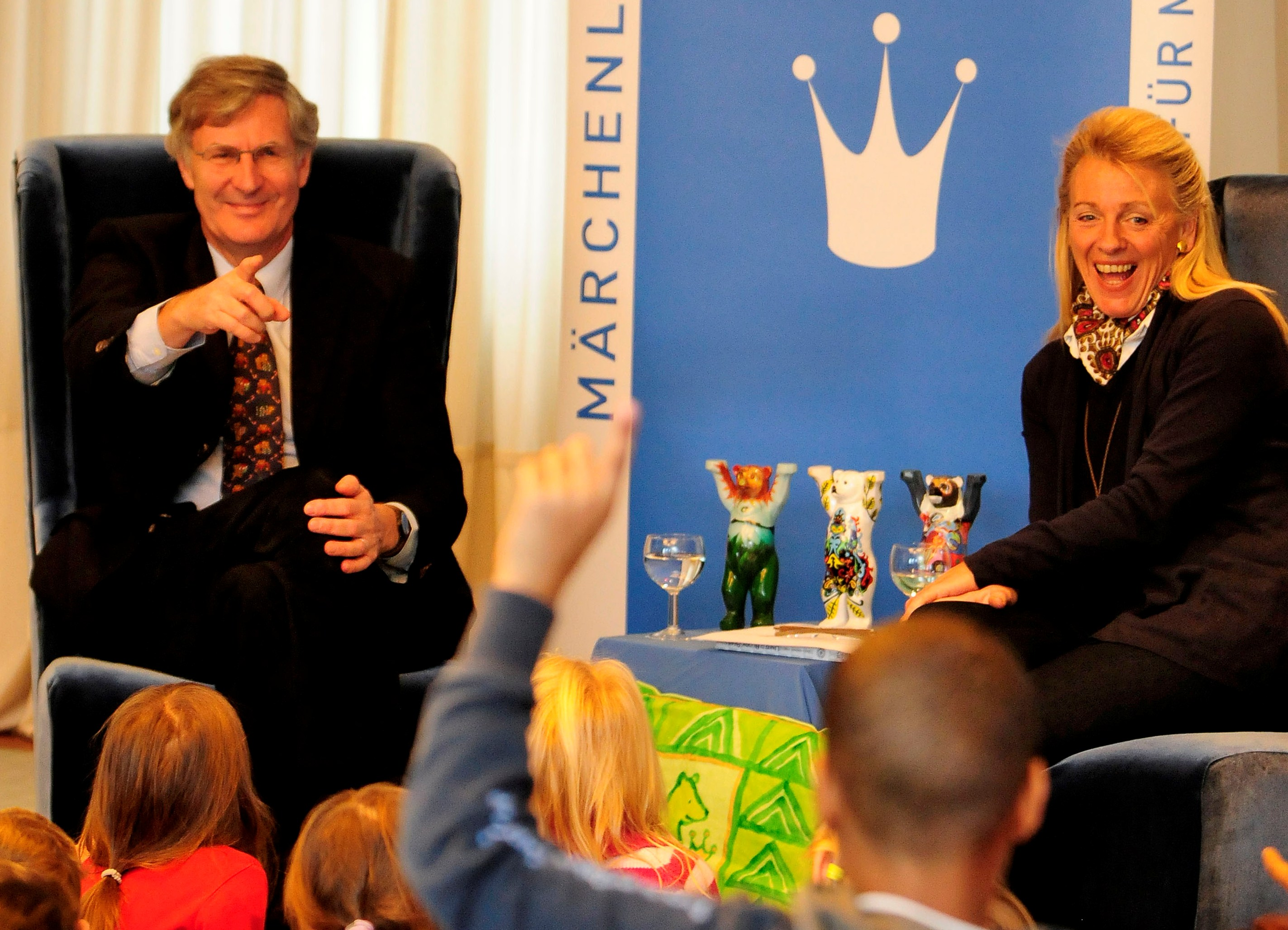
Eva and Klaus Herlitz at "Märchentage", Berlin, 2013

Klaus Herlitz and Eva Herlitz (died 26 February 2021) were a German married couple and businesspeople living in Berlin. They developed United Buddy Bears, "an international symbol of collaboration among nations of what can be achieved when we work together toward a better tomorrow".

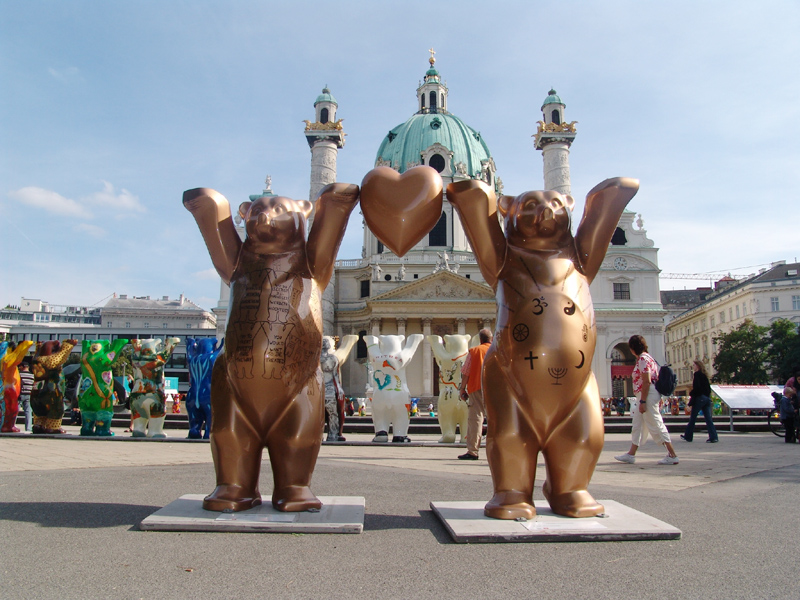
The Golden Buddy Bears designed by Eva Herlitz

On 1 October 2013, Eva and Klaus Herlitz received the Verdienstorden des Landes Berlin (Merit of the State of Berlin), for outstanding service to the state. For outstanding social engagement Eva and Klaus Herlitz received the Bundesverdienstkreuz (Order of Merit of the Federal Republic of Germany) medal on 17 January 2019.

== Buddy Bears ==
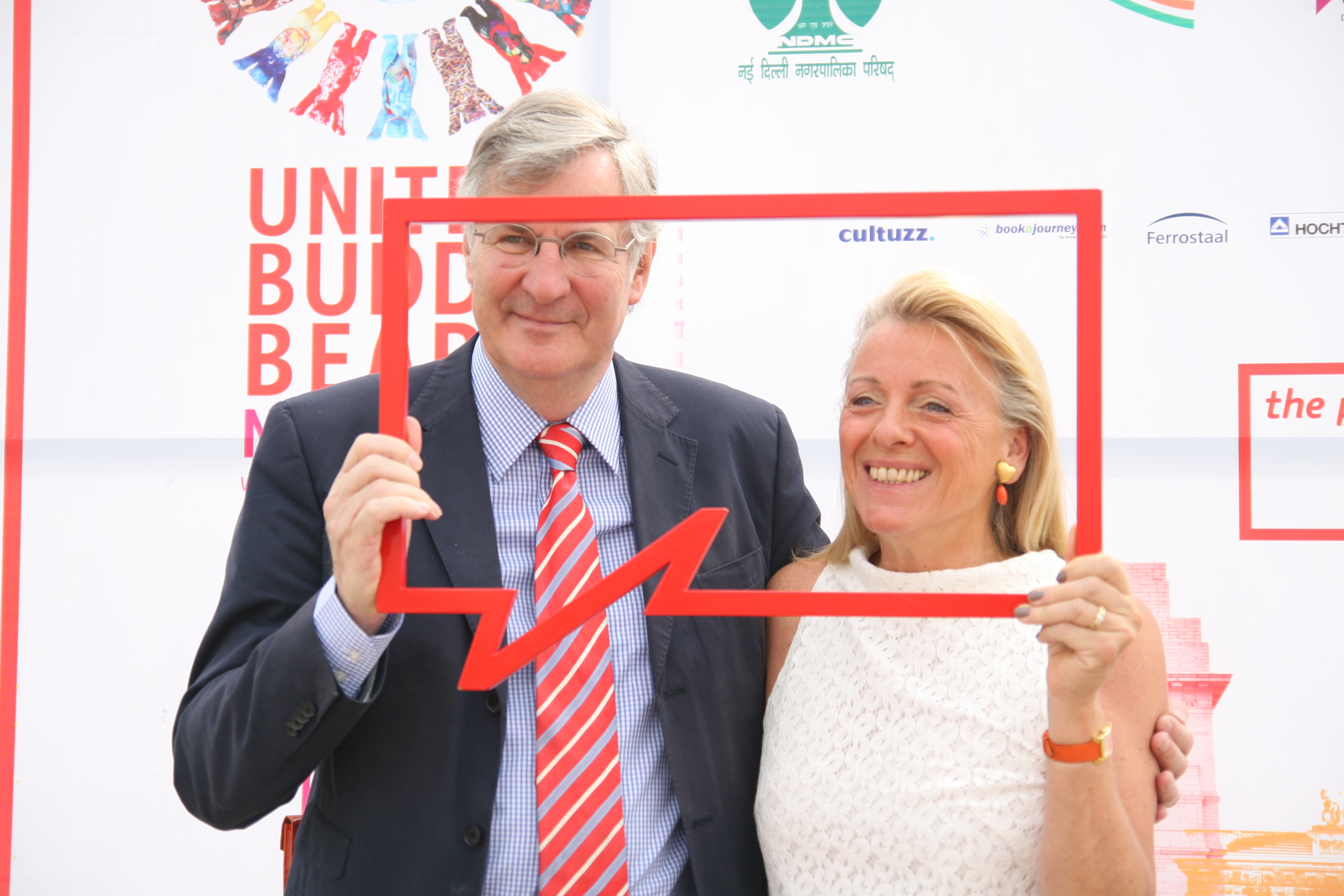
Eva and Klaus Herlitz, New Delhi, 2012

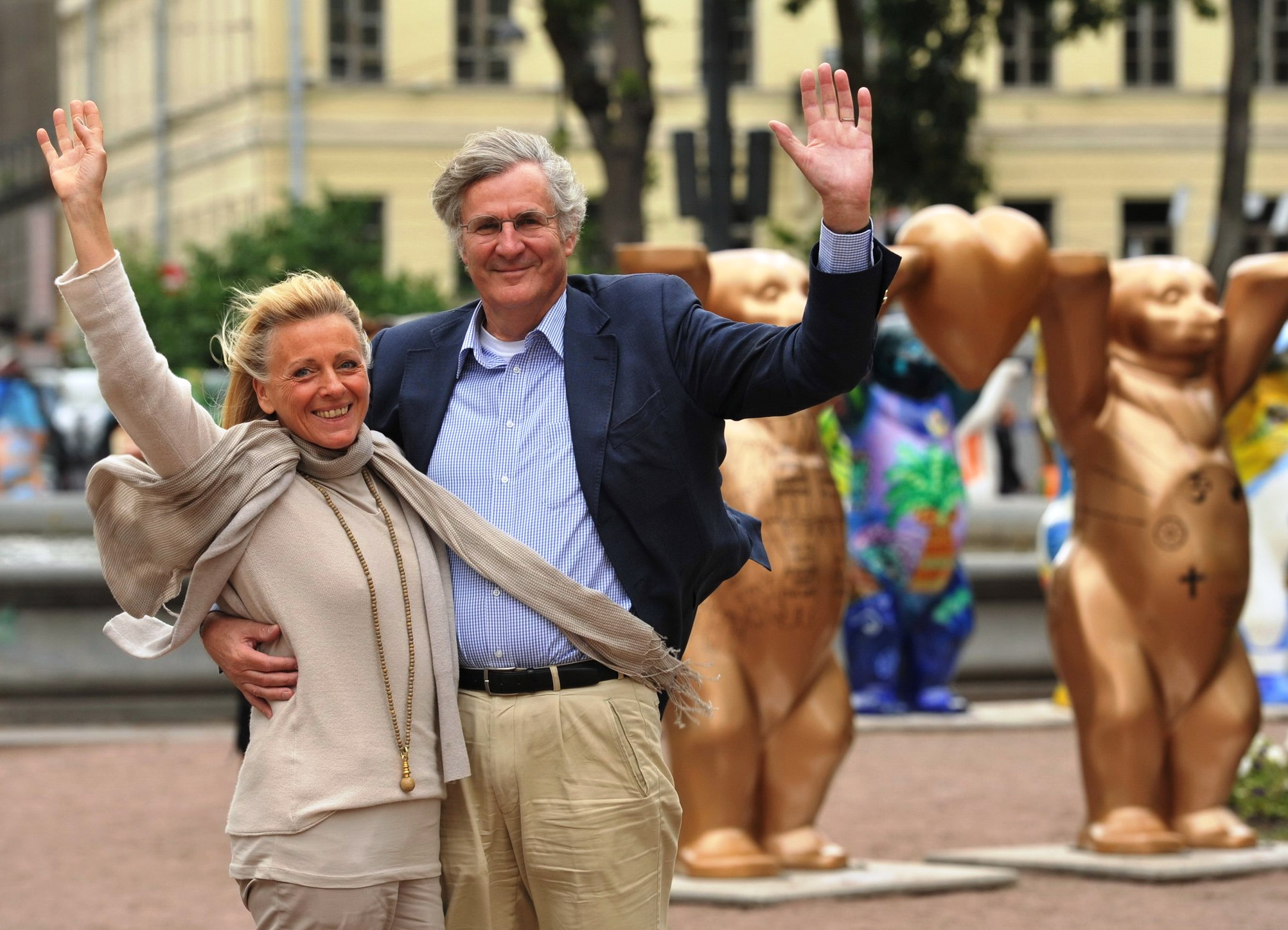
Eva and Klaus Herlitz, Saint Petersburg, 2012

Buddy Bears began as a street art event in Berlin, started by Klaus and Eva Herlitz in 2001. Hundreds of bears were created and displayed in the city that year. There were bears on all fours, on two legs, standing on their heads and sitting down. These bears have gone on tour around the world in Shanghai, Buenos Aires and St Gallen, Switzerland.

== United Buddy Bears ==
In Berlin 2002, the idea was born to motivate as many countries acknowledged by the United Nations as possible to select an artist - with the result that as of today, more than 148 artists have designed a large, 2-meter (6 ft 7 in)-tall Buddy Bear. Each bear is an artistic expression of the individual country. These bears are placed next to each other in a large circle - generally in alphabetical order - as a unique synthesis of the arts.

This project involves selecting artists from various countries to represent different cultures. The display provides information regarding the culture, history, people, and landscape of these nations. The United Buddy Bears circle serves as a platform for countries that may receive less international attention, placing them alongside larger nations.

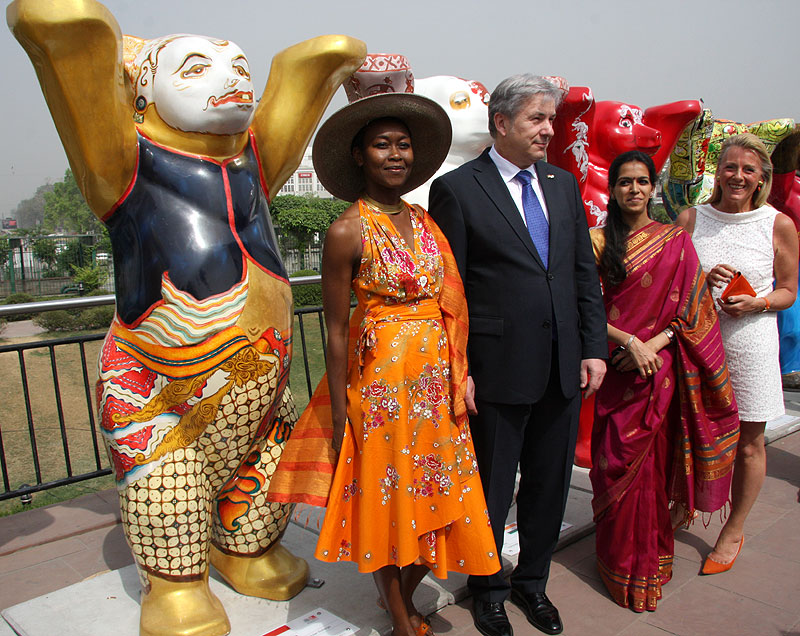
Opening ceremony 2012 in New Delhi: Klaus Wowereit (Governing Mayor of Berlin) and Eva Herlitz (right) with international guests

The circle - representing The Art of Tolerance with its symbolism of love, peace, freedom and friendship - has been presented on all five continents in over 35 metropolises of this world - always in the very heart of the cities. The bears have been displayed at the following Stations since the beginning of the tour in 2002: Berlin (Germany), Kitzbuehel (Austria), Hong Kong, Istanbul (Turkey), Tokyo (Japan), Seoul (South Korea), Sydney (Australia), Vienna (Austria), Cairo (Egypt), Jerusalem (Israel), Warsaw (Poland), Stuttgart (Germany), Pyongyang (North Korea), Buenos Aires (Argentina), Montevideo (Uruguay), Astana (Kazakhstan), Helsinki (Finland), Sofia (Bulgaria), Kuala Lumpur (Malaysia), New Delhi (India), Saint Petersburg (Russia), Paris (France), Rio de Janeiro (Brazil), Havana (Cuba), Santiago de Chile (Chile), Riga (Latvia), Antigua Guatemala, Guatemala City, Ljubljana (Slovenia), Singapore.

Admission to the exhibition is always free of charge. The number of visitors has often exceeded 1 million.

As soon as a country decides to commission a new Buddy Bear, the predecessor is sold at an auction in aid of UNICEF or other child relief organizations all over the world. So far, over EUR 2,600,000 (since 2002 till 2024) have been raised at auctions in various cities of the world.

== Buddy Bear Help ==
Eva Herlitz, together with several international artists, founded in Berlin in 2004 Buddy Bear Help, a children's charity which guarantees that 100 percent of received donations and auction revenues from charity activities will be used for the selected children's projects. Furthermore, all administrative costs are borne by the club members.

== Publications ==
- Herlitz, Eva and Klaus, Buddy Bear Berlin Show. NeptunArt Publisher, 2001. ISBN 3-85820-152-9
- Herlitz, Eva and Klaus, United Buddy Bears - Die Kunst der Toleranz. Bostelmann & Siebenhaar Publishers, 2003. ISBN 3-936962-00-6
- Herlitz, Eva and Klaus, United Buddy Bears - World Tour. NeptunArt Publisher, 2006. ISBN 3-85820-189-8
- Herlitz, Eva and Klaus: United Buddy Bears - The Art of Tolerance, 384 pages, English/German, 2009, ISBN 978-3-00-029417-4.
- Herlitz, Eva and Klaus: Buddy Bear Berlin, 4th edition, December 2015, ISBN 978-3-00-038736-4.
- Herlitz, Eva and Klaus: United Buddy Bears – The Art of Tolerance on World Tour, 288 pages, English/German, 2017, ISBN 978-3-00-057649-2.
- Herlitz, Klaus: Die Buddy Bären und der schneeweisse Elefant, a German children's book, illustrated by Manon Kahle. December 2010, ISBN 978-3-00-032739-1.
- Herlitz, Eva: Buddy Bear Colouring Book, colouring book, illustrated by Anja Boje, 16 pages. May 2011, ISBN 978-3-00-034225-7.
