= United Buddy Bears =

Sculpture series

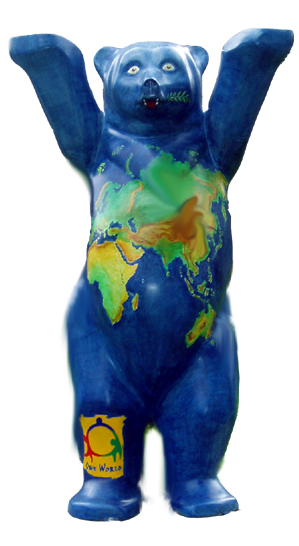
One World Buddy Bear

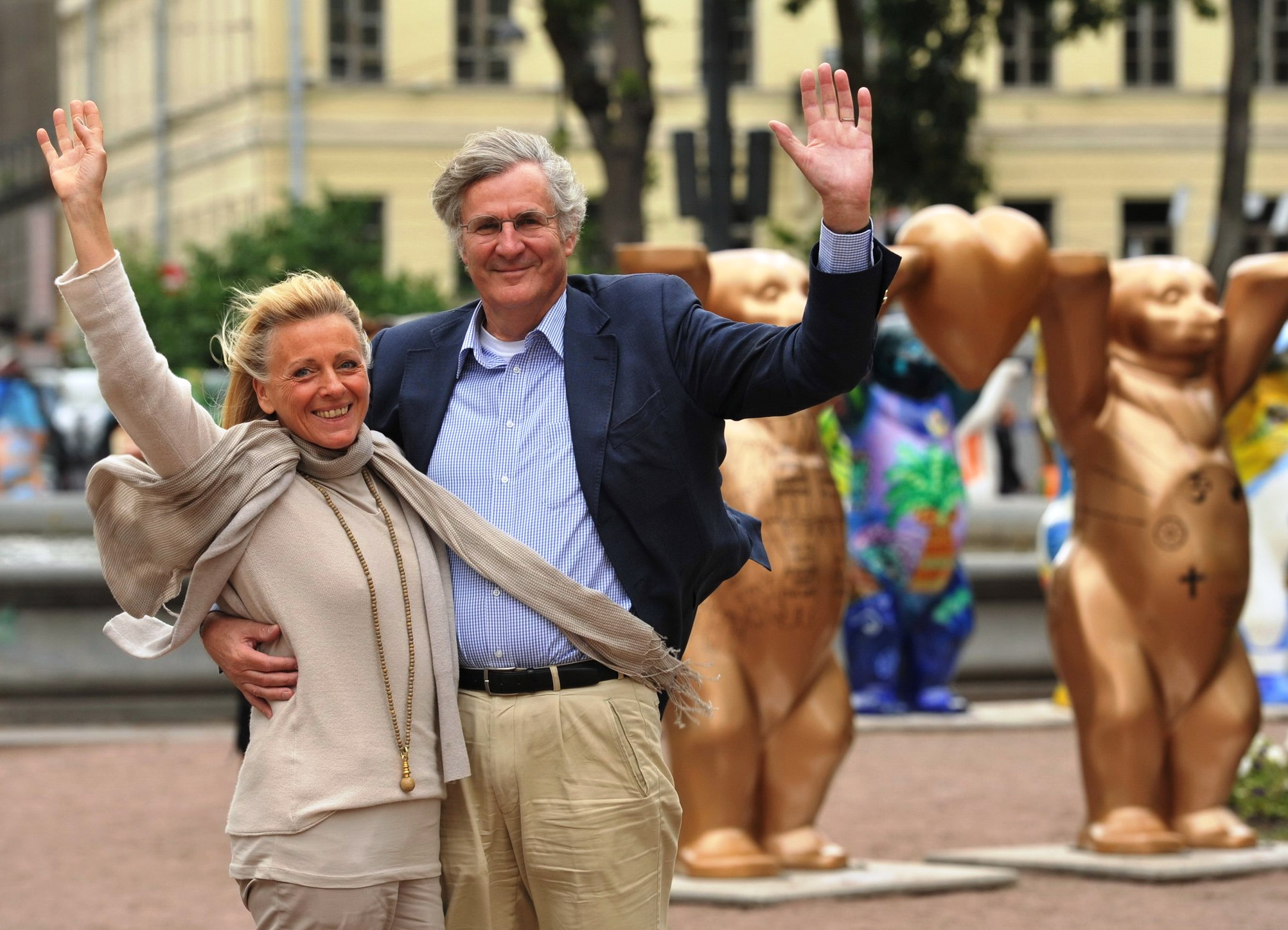
Eva and Klaus Herlitz, Exhibition in Saint Petersburg, 2012

Buddy Bears are painted, life-size fiberglass bear sculptures developed by German businesspeople Klaus and Eva Herlitz, in cooperation with sculptor Roman Strobl. They have become a landmark of Berlin and are considered unofficial ambassadors of Germany. The outstretched arms of the standing Buddy Bear symbolise friendliness and optimism. The first bears were displayed at an artistic event in Berlin in 2001.

== Buddy Bear Berlin Show ==
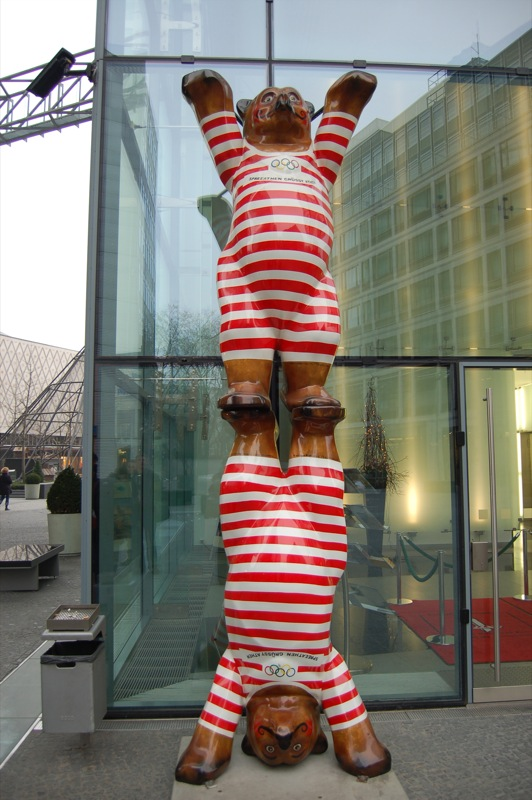
Two Buddy Bears at Kurfürstendamm 21, Berlin

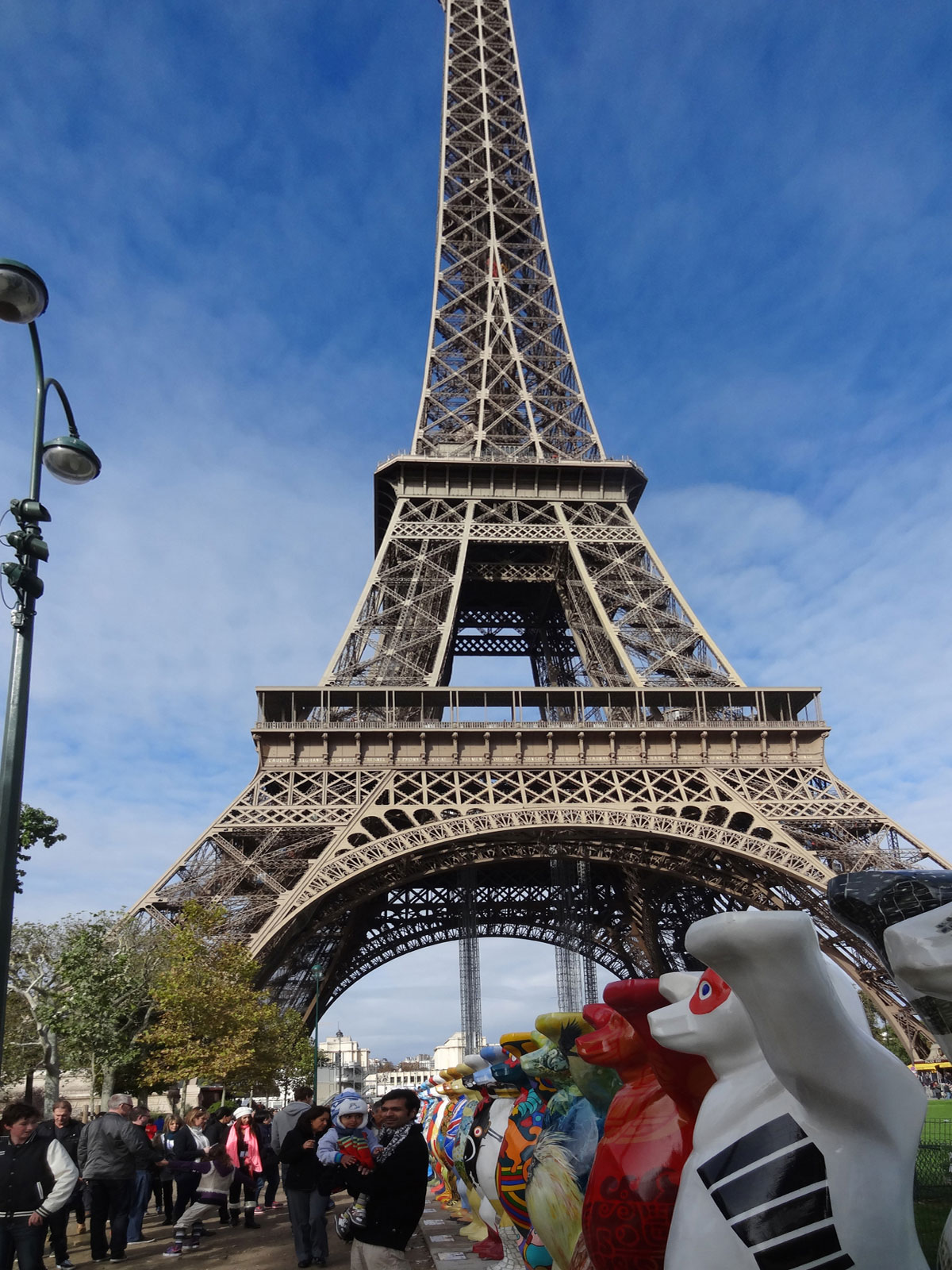
United Buddy Bears — Exhibition Paris 2012

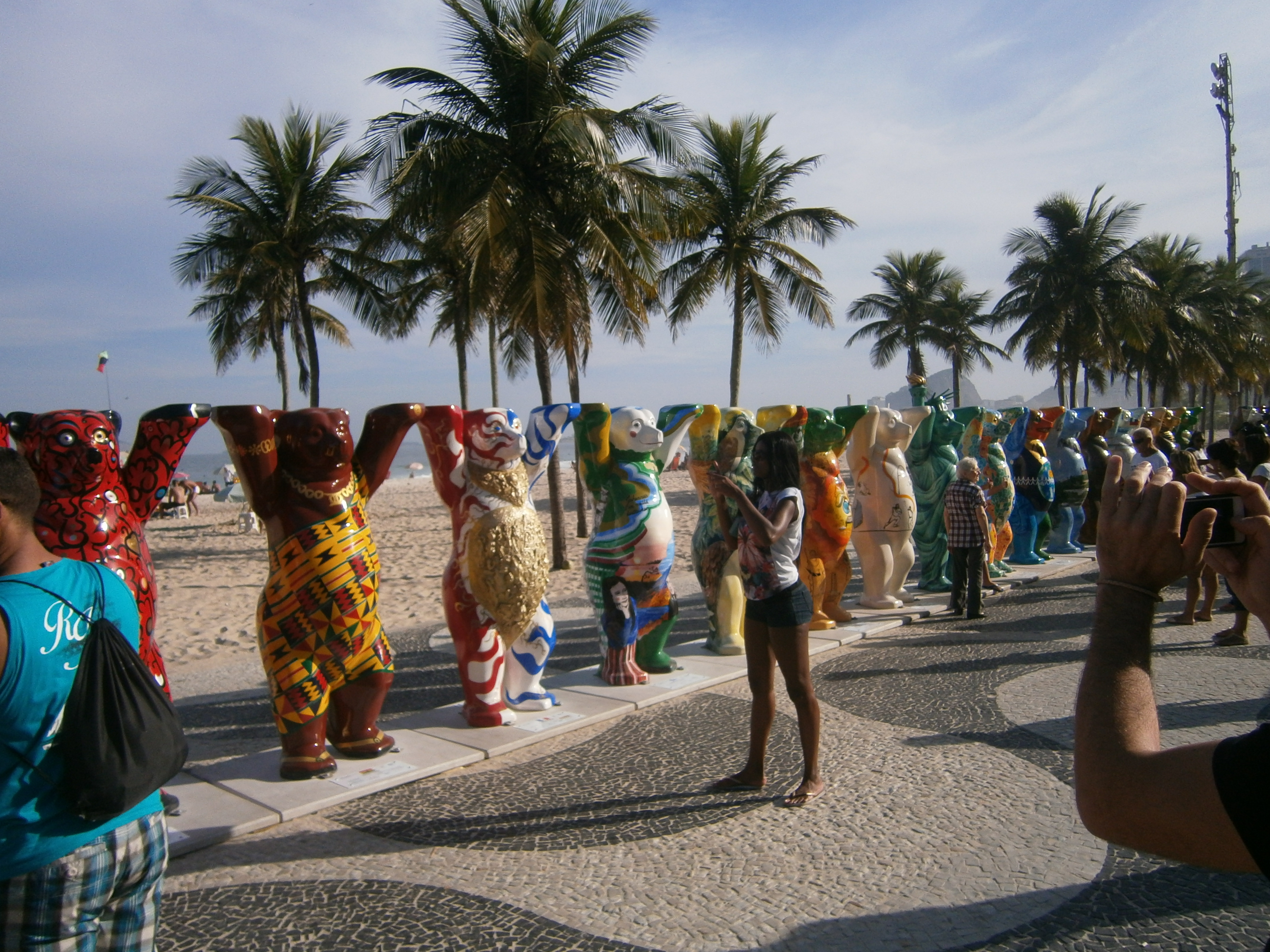
United Buddy Bears, Exhibition Rio de Janeiro

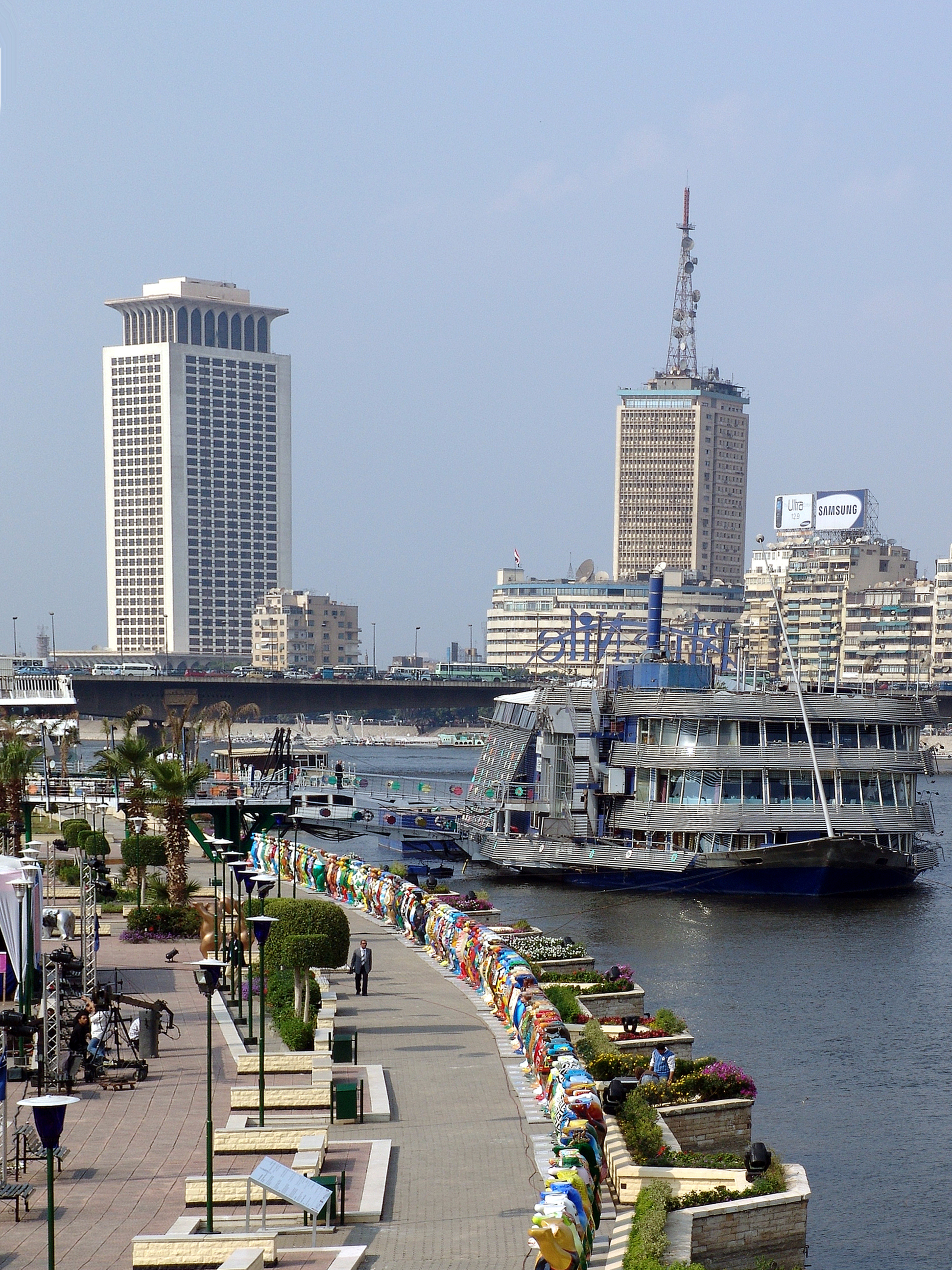
United Buddy Bears, Exhibition Cairo 2007

The first activities were presented as the Buddy Bear Berlin Show. In 2001, artists painted approximately 350 bears to appear as decorative elements in the streets of Berlin. Four different bear designs (one standing on all four paws, one standing on two legs, one standing on its head, and one in a sitting position) were placed in the historic center of Berlin. Afterwards, many of the bears were sold at auctions in aid of local child relief nonprofits.

Nowadays, these Berlin Buddy Bears are exclusively presented on private premises, in front of hotels and embassies, as well as in the foyers of various office buildings. There have been exhibitions of the original Buddy Bears — designed by local artists — in the cities of Shanghai (2004), Buenos Aires (2005), and St. Gallen / Switzerland (2006).

== United Buddy Bears ==
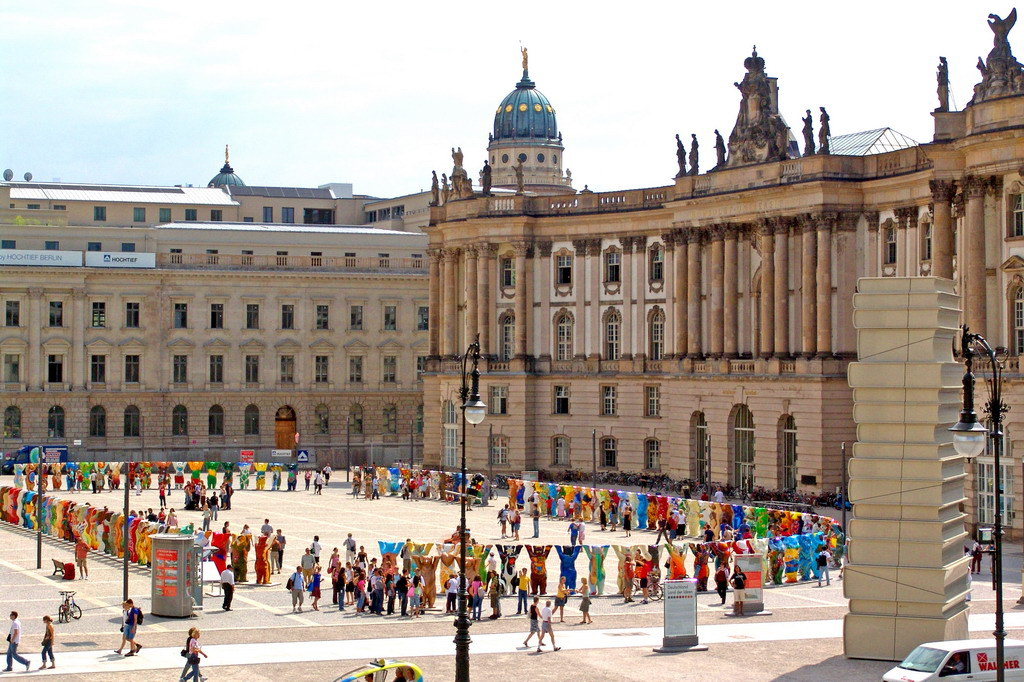
United Buddy Bears, Exhibition, Berlin 2006

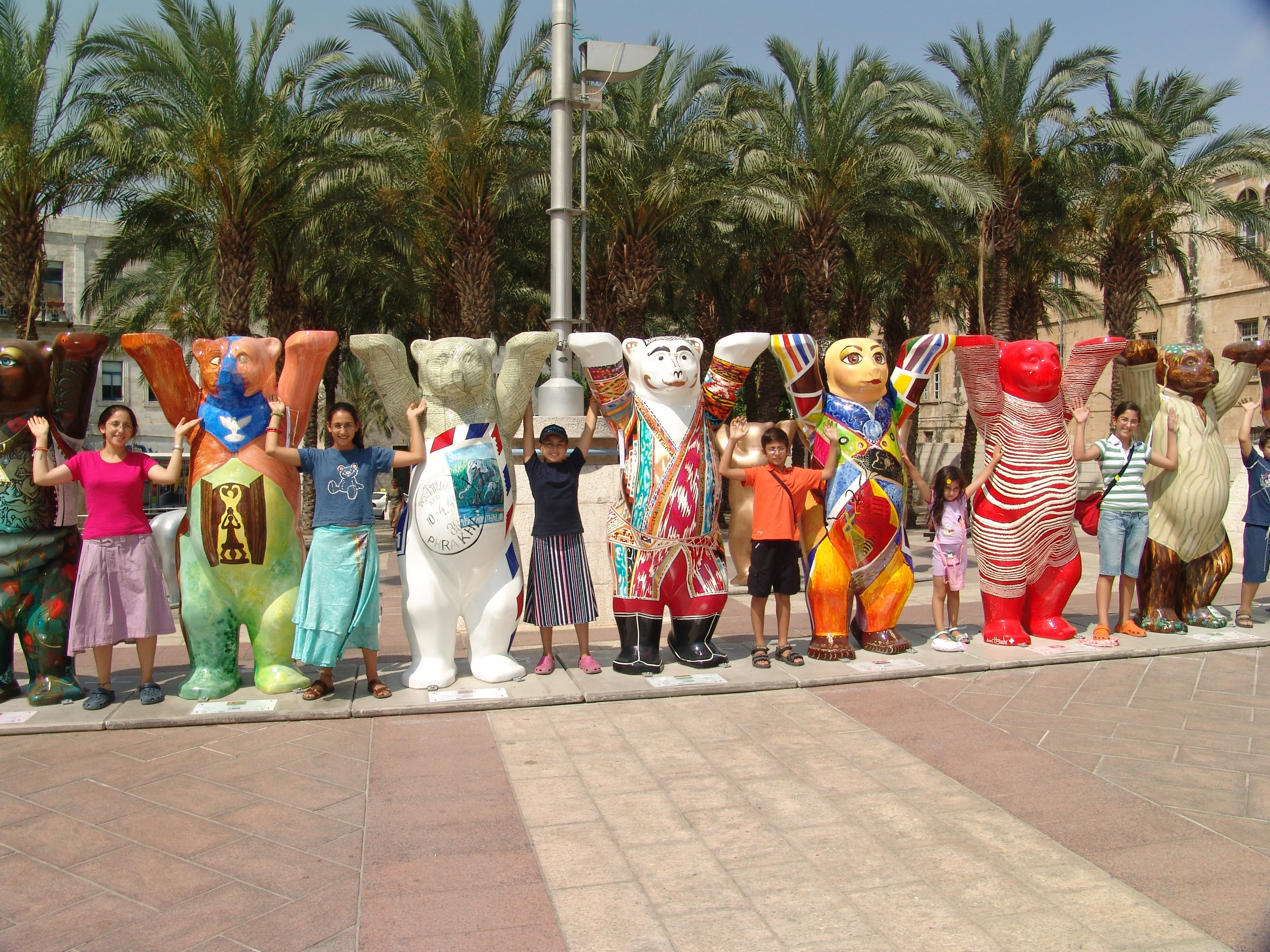
United Buddy Bears, Exhibition Jerusalem 2007

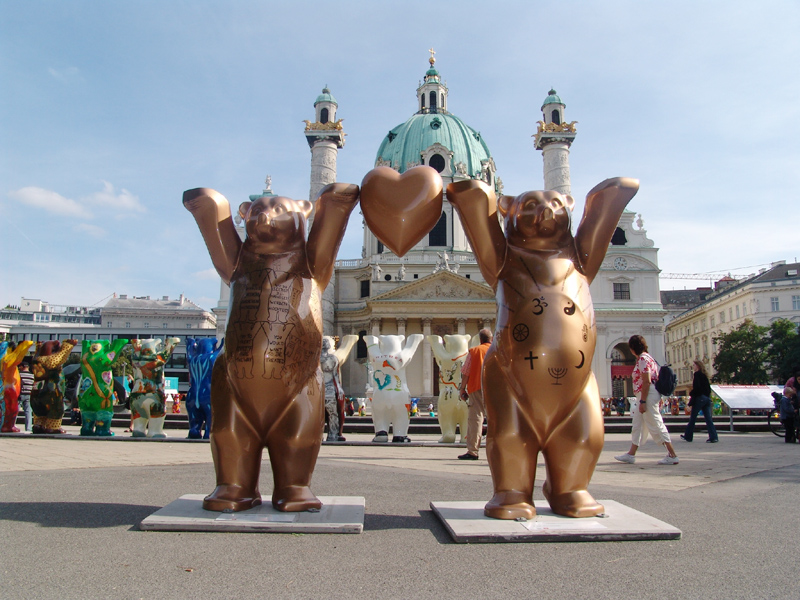
United Buddy Bears, Exhibition Vienna 2006

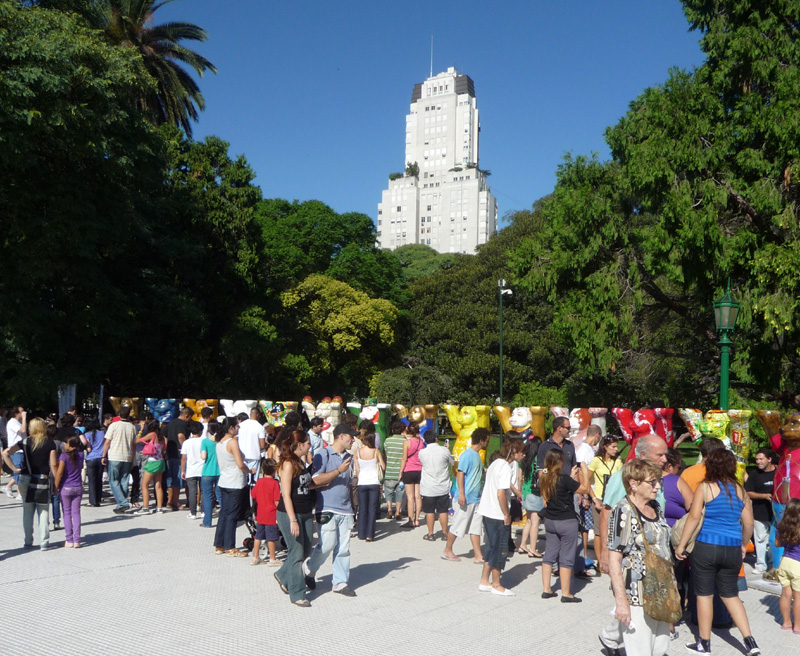
United Buddy Bears, Exhibition Buenos Aires 2009

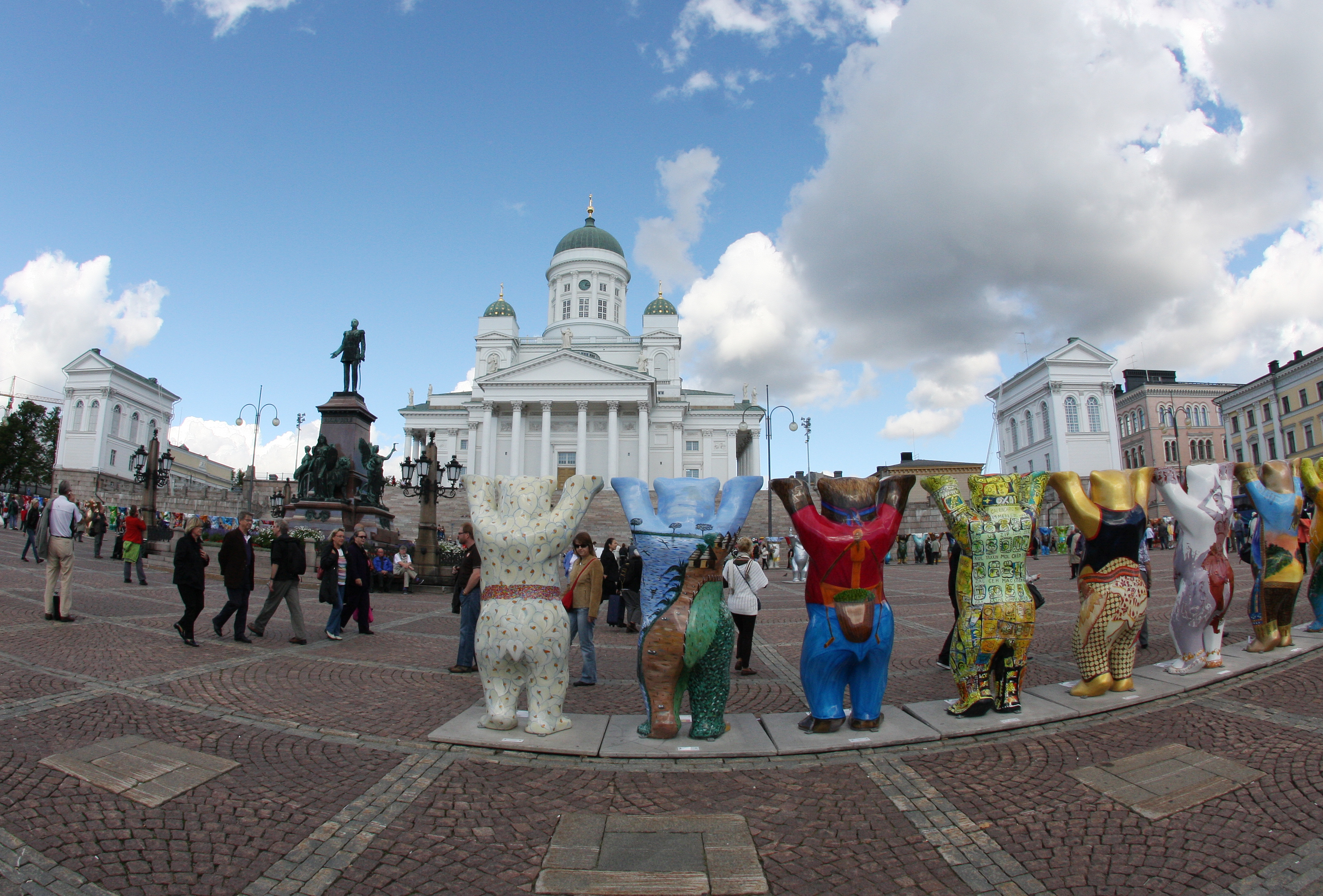
United Buddy Bears, Exhibition Helsinki 2010, Senate Square

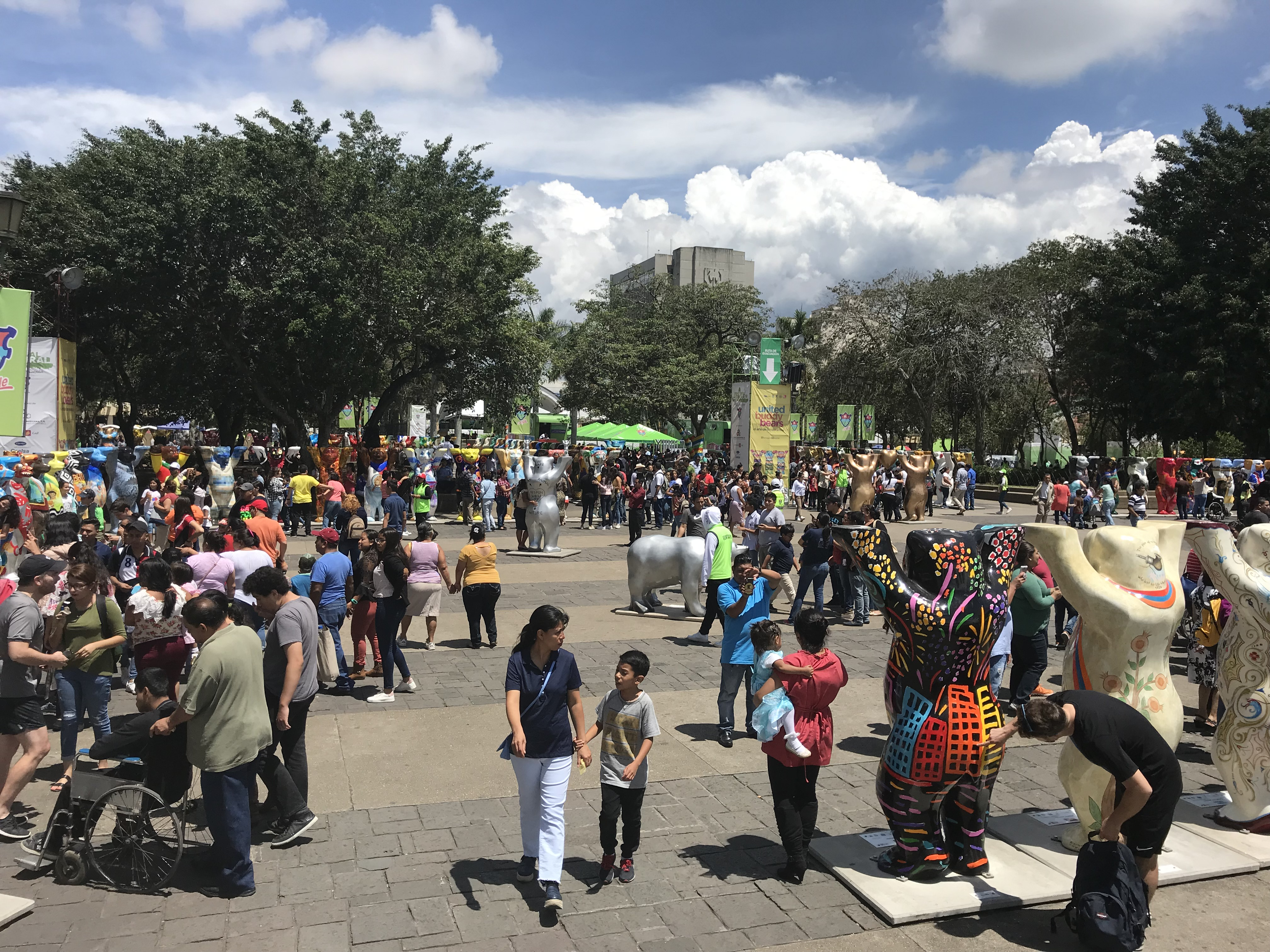
Guatemala City 2019 Plaza de la Constitución

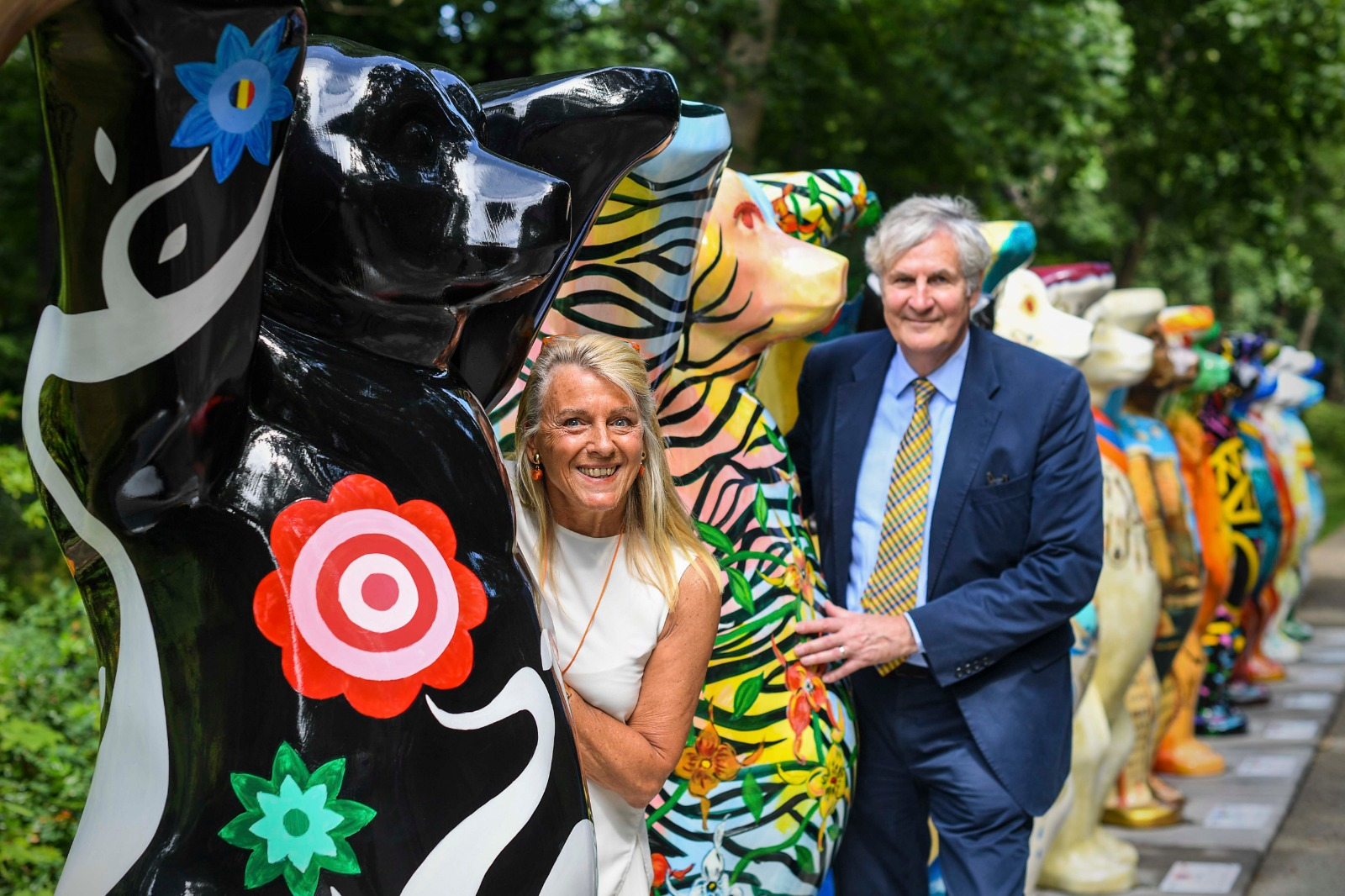
Tierpark Berlin 2020 Eva and Klaus Herlitz

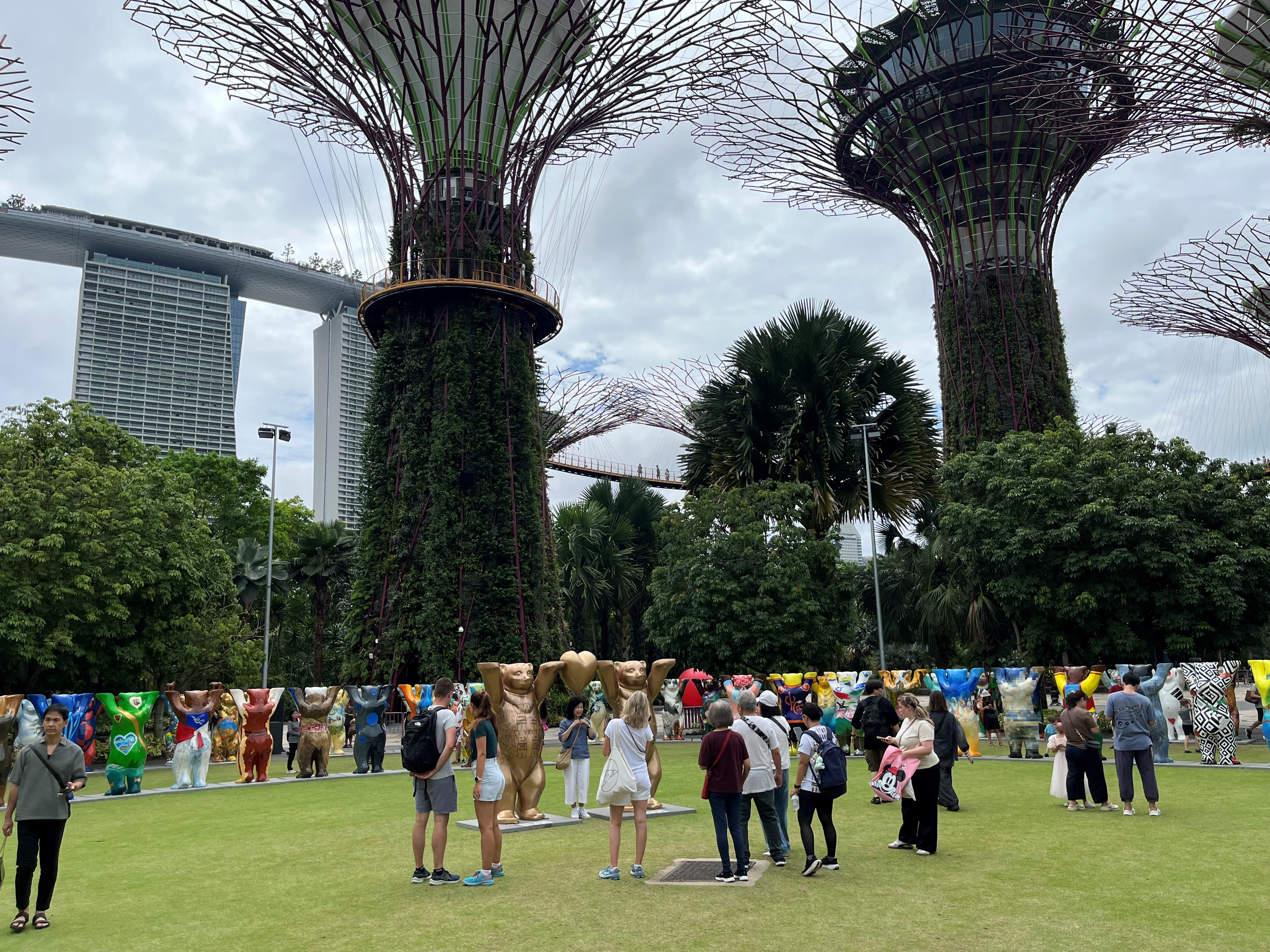
Singapore 2025 Gardens by the Bay

United Buddy Bears is an international art exhibition with more than 145 2-meter (6 ft 7 in)-tall fiberglass bears. Under the motto: "We have to get to know each other better, it makes us understand one another better, trust each other more, and live together more peacefully", more than 140 countries acknowledged by the United Nations are represented, promoting "tolerance, international understanding and the great concept of different nations and cultures living in peace and harmony". The bears stand "hand in hand" in a "peaceful circle" (The Art of Tolerance). The bears were on display between June and November 2002, in a circle around the Brandenburg Gate. Around 1.5 million people visited this first exhibition. On 6 November 2002, the bears were moved to new locations, including their respective countries' embassies in Berlin, or back to the country that they were based on. Some of the bears were auctioned off to raise money for UNICEF.

After the success of the first exhibition, a new circle was created in 2003. The idea was to send the circle on a global tour. The circle changes when it reaches a new city, as the bears are always set up in alphabetic order, following the local language of the host country. Entry to the exhibitions is always free. In every metropolis, the United Buddy Bears exhibitions are supported by the government, the foreign ministries, the mayors, local nonprofits, and UNICEF. The bears have been displayed at the following locations since the beginning of the tour:

Year	Country / city site of exhibition	Patron of the exhibition / opening by
2002; June – November	Germany; Berlin, next to the Brandenburg Gate – Pariser Platz	Joschka Fischer, Federal Minister for Foreign Affairs; Klaus Wowereit, Berlin's Governing Mayor
2003; July – November	Germany; Berlin, next to the Brandenburg Gate – Pariser Platz	Sir Peter Ustinov, actor and UNICEF World Ambassador; Dan Coats, U.S. Ambassador to Germany
2004; January – February	Austria; Kitzbühel	Benita Ferrero-Waldner, Austrian Minister of Foreign Affairs; Horst Wendling, Mayor of Kitzbühel
2004; May – June	Hong Kong, China; Hong Kong, Victoria Park	Jackie Chan, actor and UNICEF Goodwill Ambassador; Patrick Ho, Hong Kong's Secretary for Home Affairs
2004 / 2005; December – January	Turkey; Istanbul, Tepebaşı Pera Square, Beyoğlu	Ahmet Misbah Demircan, Mayor of Beyoğlu; Rainer Möckelmann, German General Consul in Istanbul
2005; April – May	Japan; Tokyo, Roppongi Hills	Junichiro Koizumi, Prime Minister of Japan; Horst Köhler, President of the Federal Republic of Germany
2005; October – November	South Korea; Seoul, Olympic Park	Messages of greeting from the Minister of Foreign Affairs of Korea, Ban Ki-moon
2006; March – April	Australia; Sydney, Sydney Opera House – Circular Quay	John Howard, Prime Minister of Australia; Ken Done, artist and UNICEF Ambassador
2006; June – July	Germany; Berlin, Bebelplatz	Heidemarie Wieczorek-Zeul, German Federal Minister for Economic Cooperation and Development; Karin Schubert, Mayor of Berlin; Mia Farrow, American actress and UNICEF Goodwill Ambassador
2006; September – October	Austria; Vienna, Karlsplatz	Grete Laska, Deputy Mayor of Vienna; Karin Schubert, Mayor of Berlin; Christiane Hörbiger, film actress and UNICEF Ambassador
2007; April – May	Egypt; Cairo, Gezira Promenade Zamalek	Suzanne Mubarak, First Lady of Egypt; Hans-Dietrich Genscher, former German Foreign Minister; Abdel Azim Wazir, Governor of Cairo
2007; August – September	Israel; Jerusalem, Safra Square	Tzipi Livni, Minister of Foreign Affairs, Israel; Yigal Amedi, Deputy Mayor of Jerusalem; Iris Berben, German actress and winner of the Women's World Award 2004
2008; May – June	Poland; Warsaw, Castle Square	Hanna Gronkiewicz-Waltz, Mayor of the City of Warsaw; Klaus Wowereit, Governing Mayor of Berlin; Anne Hidalgo, First Deputy Mayor of Paris
2008; July -August	Germany; Stuttgart, Schlossplatz	Wolfgang Schuster, Lord Mayor of Stuttgart
2008; October	North Korea; Pyongyang, Moran Hill Youth Park, close to the Kim-Il-Sung statue	Mun Jae Chol, Foreign Affairs of North-Korea; Thomas Schäfer, German Ambassador in North Korea
2009; March – April	Argentina; Buenos Aires, Plaza San Martin	Mauricio Macri, Mayor of Buenos Aires; Hernán Lombardi, Minister for Cultural Affairs
2009; May – June	Uruguay; Montevideo, Plaza Independencia	Tabaré Vázquez, President of Uruguay; Ricardo Ehrlich, Mayor of Montevideo; Bernhard Graf von Waldersee, German Ambassador in Uruguay
2009 / 2010; November – April	Germany; Berlin, Hauptbahnhof, Indoor	Ursula von der Leyen, Federal Ministry of Family Affairs; Dennenesch Zoudé, German actress and United Buddy Bears Special Ambassador
2010; May – July	Kazakhstan; Astana, next to the Bayterek Tower	Imangali Tasmagambetov, Akim of Astana; Rainer Schlageter, German Ambassador in Kazakhstan
2010; September – October	Finland; Helsinki, Senate Square	Jussi Pajunen, Mayor of Helsinki; Peter Scholz, German Ambassador in Finland
2011; April – May	Bulgaria; Sofia, Square St Nedelya	Yordanka Fandakova, Mayor of Sofia; Klaus Wowereit, Berlin's Governing Mayor; Matthias Martin Höpfner, German Ambassador in Bulgaria
2011; June – October	Germany; Berlin, Kurfürstendamm	Klaus Wowereit, Berlin's Governing Mayor; Monika Thiemen, Mayor of Charlottenburg-Wilmersdorf
2011 / 2012; December – February	Malaysia; Kuala Lumpur, next to Pavilion Kuala Lumpur	Sultan Sharafuddin Idris Shah, Sultan of Selangor; Ahmad Fuad Ismail, Mayor of Kuala Lumpur
2012; March – May	India; New Delhi, Connaught Place	Sheila Dikshit, Chief Minister of Delhi; Klaus Wowereit, Berlin's Governing Mayor
2012; June – August	Russia; Saint Petersburg, Alexander Garden, next to the Palace Square	Vladimir Putin, President of Russia; Joachim Gauck, President of Germany
2012; October–November	France; Paris / Eiffel Tower – Champ de Mars	Guido Westerwelle, German Minister of Foreign Affairs; Bertrand Delanoë, Mayor of Paris; Pierre Schapira, Member of the European Parliament
2014; May – July	Brazil; Rio de Janeiro, Copacabana	Eduardo Paes, Mayor of Rio de Janeiro; Jürgen Trittin, German Federal Ministry for the Environment from 1998 to 2005; Harald Klein, German General Consul in Rio de Janeiro
2015; January – March	Cuba; Havana, Plaza San Francisco de Asis	Eusebio Leal, Ambassador of Goodwill of the United Nations; Peter Scholz, German Ambassador in Cuba; Eva and Klaus Herlitz, the initiators of the United Buddy Bears activities
2015; April – June	Chile; Santiago de Chile, Vitacura, Parque Bicentenario	Heraldo Muñoz Valenzuela, Foreign Affairs Minister of Chile; Hans Henning Blomeyer-Bartenstein, German Ambassador in Chile
2016; August – October	Malaysia; George Town, Esplanade	Lim Guan Eng, Chief Minister of Penang
2017 / 2018; December – January	Germany; Berlin, Walter-Benjamin-Platz	Marianne von Weizsäcker, Patron of the exhibition Sawsan Chebli, Berlin (Senat)
2018; July – August	Latvia; Riga, Dome Square	Dace Melbārde, Latvian Culture Minister; Nils Ušakovs, Riga City Mayor
2019; April – May	Guatemala; Antigua, Plaza Mayor	Sandra Jovel, Foreign Affairs Minister of Guatemala; Susana Asencio Lueg, Mayor of Antigua; Harald Klein, German Ambassador in Guatemala
2019; May – June	Guatemala; Guatemala City, Plaza de la Constitución	Sandra Jovel, Foreign Affairs Minister of Guatemala; Ricardo Quiñónez Lemus, Mayor of Guatemala City; Eva Herlitz und Harald Klein
2020/ 2023; July – September	Germany; Berlin, Tierpark Berlin	Franziska Giffey, German Minister for Family Affairs; Michael Müller, Governing Mayor of Berlin; Klaus and Eva Herlitz
2024; May–July	Slovenia; Ljubljana / Trg republike	Urška Klakočar Zupančič, Speaker of the National Assembly; Zoran Janković, Mayor of Ljubljana; Natalie Kauther, German ambassador Klaus Herlitz, initiators of United Buddy Bears activities
2025; August–October	Singapore; Singapore / Gardens by the Bay	Dinesh Vasu Dash, Mayor of South East District of Singapore; Felix Loh, CEO, Gardens by the Bay; Bettina Fanghänel, German ambassador Klaus Herlitz, initiator of United Buddy Bears activities

=== Highlights ===
- 2003 Berlin: Having visited the exhibition in Berlin in 2002, Sir Peter Ustinov insisted that Iraq should be represented in the circle of United Buddy Bears in the future. In 2003, Iraq took part in the circle for the first time and Ustinov gave the opening address of the exhibition in the presence of more than 70 ambassadors.
- 2004 Hong Kong: Jackie Chan saw the exhibition in Berlin in 2003. On his initiative, the international bears travelled to Hong Kong one year later. Chan became the patron for this event. More than 3,000 VIPs from the world of politics, business and culture took part in the opening ceremony.
- 2005 Seoul: In the run-up to the exhibition in South Korea, two artists got the permission to travel from North Korea to Germany via Beijing in order to design a United Buddy Bear in Berlin on behalf of their country. Hence it was possible that both North- and South Korea stood together hand in hand for the first time during an art exhibition.
- 2007 Jerusalem: All countries of the Arab World were represented in the circle of 132 nations, with a Palestinian bear on an equal footing with all the other bears for the first time in Jerusalem.
- 2008 Pyongyang: It was the first exhibition in North Korea that was accessible for everyone and open to everybody. According to official information, around 100,000 visitors were counted every week in Pyongyang.
- 2012 Paris: United Buddy Bears are on show near the Eiffel Tower to celebrate the 25th anniversary of the twinning of Paris and Berlin and the 50th anniversary of the Élysée Treaty which marked the official reconciliation between France and Germany after world war two.
- 2014 Rio de Janeiro: From May till July the famous United Buddy Bears exhibit has found its way to the shores of Rio de Janeiro just in time for the 2014 soccer World Cup. The exhibition was held on the Copacabana promenade, which attracted more than 1,000,000 people. The presentation consisted of more than 140 bear sculptures, each 2 meters (6 ft 7 in) in height and designed by a different artist.
- 2015 Havana: "Germany sends peace message through sculptures in Cuba". 124 bears are standing "hand in hand" on the square "Plaza San Francisco de Asis". They were designed by 124 artists and represent 124 countries. All these countries – large or small, poor or rich – are placed together at the same level, including the US and Cuba! All these countries are reaching out – for tolerance, peace and democracy.

=== The Minis ===
In the autumn of 2003, the circle of United Buddy Bears-The Minis was presented in Berlin for the first time. Since then, this circle has been shown in Frankfurt/Main, in Potsdam and at the Sony Center in Berlin, as well as destinations outside of Germany, including Bratislava in Slovakia, Calais in France, and Yekaterinburg and Kazan in Russia.

== Aid for children in need ==
As of June 2024, donations and proceeds from the sale of Buddy Bears at auction had generated a total of Euro 2,600,000 in support of UNICEF and local nonprofits that help children in need.

== Involved artists ==
In the early years, the Bears were designed by regional artists and Berlin celebrities for the exhibition Art in the City. From 2002 onwards, thanks to support from Lufthansa, Air Berlin and the Berlin Hotel Association, artists from all five continents took part in the international project United Buddy Bears. More than 240 artists from over 150 countries have taken part in this project to date, such as Arik Brauer, René Cadena Ayala, Hernando León, Ibrahim Hazimeh, Carlos Páez Vilaró, Seo Soo-Kyoung, Helge Leiberg, Leda Luss Luyken, Ludmila Seefried-Matějková, Monira Al Qadiri, Thuraya Al-Baqsami. This is also echoed by the artist and UNICEF Australian National Ambassador, Ken Done.

== Publications ==
- Herlitz, Eva & Klaus, Buddy Bear Berlin Show. NeptunArt Publisher, 2001. ISBN 3-85820-152-9.
- Herlitz, Eva & Klaus, United Buddy Bears — Die Kunst der Toleranz. Bostelmann & Siebenhaar Publishers, 2003. ISBN 3-936962-00-6.
- Herlitz, Eva & Klaus, United Buddy Bears — World Tour. NeptunArt Publisher, 2006. ISBN 3-85820-189-8.
- Herlitz, Eva & Klaus, United Buddy Bears — The Art of Tolerance. 384 pages, English/German, December 2009, ISBN 978-3-00-029417-4.
- Herlitz, Eva & Klaus, Buddy Bear Berlin. 4th edition, December 2015, ISBN 978-3-00-038736-4.
- Herlitz, Eva & Klaus, United Buddy Bears — The Art of Tolerance on World Tour. 288 pages, English/German, November 2017, ISBN 978-3-00-057649-2.
- Jian-Min Huang: Public Art as Festival. Hong Kong 2005, ISBN 986-7487-48-6 (Pages 63–111: Buddy Bears; Chinese/English).
