= Karin Schubert (politician) =

German politician

Karin Schubert (August 16, 1944, in Erfurt) is a German politician. She is a member of the SPD (Social Democratic Party). She served as the Minister of Justice in Saxony-Anhalt from 1994 to 2001 and later as the Justice Senator in the state of Berlin until 2006.

== Life and career ==
Karin Schubert was born in Erfurt. She spent her school years in Thuringia, North Rhine-Westphalia, and Bavaria. After studying Sociology, Psychology, and Law, she completed her second state examination in Law in 1978. Following that, she worked as a judge at local and regional courts in Wuppertal and Düsseldorf until 1988. She then took on the role of Head of the Legal and Constitutional Affairs Division at the North Rhine-Westphalia State Representation in Bonn. From 1991 to 1992, she was the director of the District Court in Neubrandenburg and from 1992 to 1994, the President of the Regional Court in Neubrandenburg.

Since 2007, Karin Schubert has been practicing law as an attorney in Berlin, joining the Kärgel de Maizière & Partner law firm in 2009. Her main areas of focus are family law and inheritance law.

== Politics ==
Since 1971, Karin Schubert has been a member of the SPD (Social Democratic Party). In 1994, Minister President Reinhard Höppner appointed her as Minister of Justice for the state of Saxony-Anhalt in his first cabinet. Upon the formation of the government after the state election in 1998, Schubert was reconfirmed in her position and remained a member of the state government (Höppner Cabinet II).

Following the electoral victory of the Berlin SPD on October 21, 2001, she was appointed by the governing mayor Klaus Wowereit as Mayor and Senator for Justice to the Senate of Berlin (Wowereit Senate II). She assumed her office on January 17, 2002, and resigned from her position as minister in Saxony-Anhalt. She did not make herself available for a second term in the Wowereit Senate after the elections to the Berlin House of Representatives in September 2006. Consequently, as a result her tenure ended in November 2006.

Karin Schubert is a member of the board of trustees of the Friedrich Ebert Foundation and has been a member of the media council of the Media Authority Berlin-Brandenburg since 2015, where she serves as its deputy chairperson.

== Honors ==
- October 25, 2002: "Women's Bridge Prize" from the Frauenbrückepreis Foundation
- December 8, 2014: Honorary Citizen of Berlin
