= 2026 Berlin state election =

German state election

- 20 September 2026

All 153 seats in the House of Representatives, including 23 overhang and leveling seats 77 seats needed for a majority
- Turnout: 1,846,170 (74.2%) ▲11.3 pp

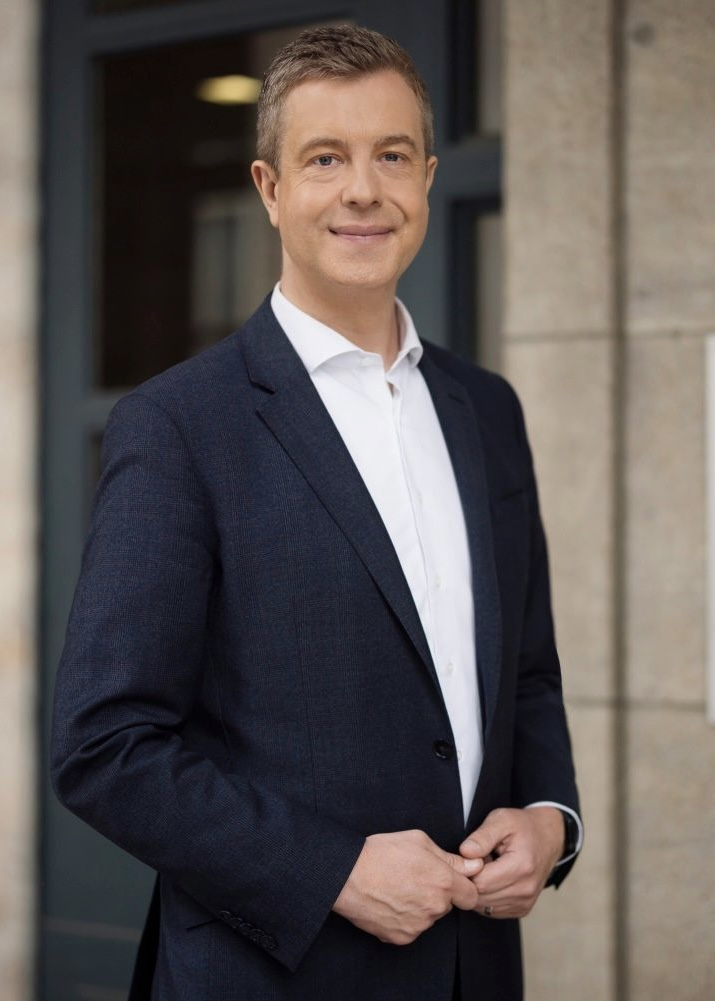

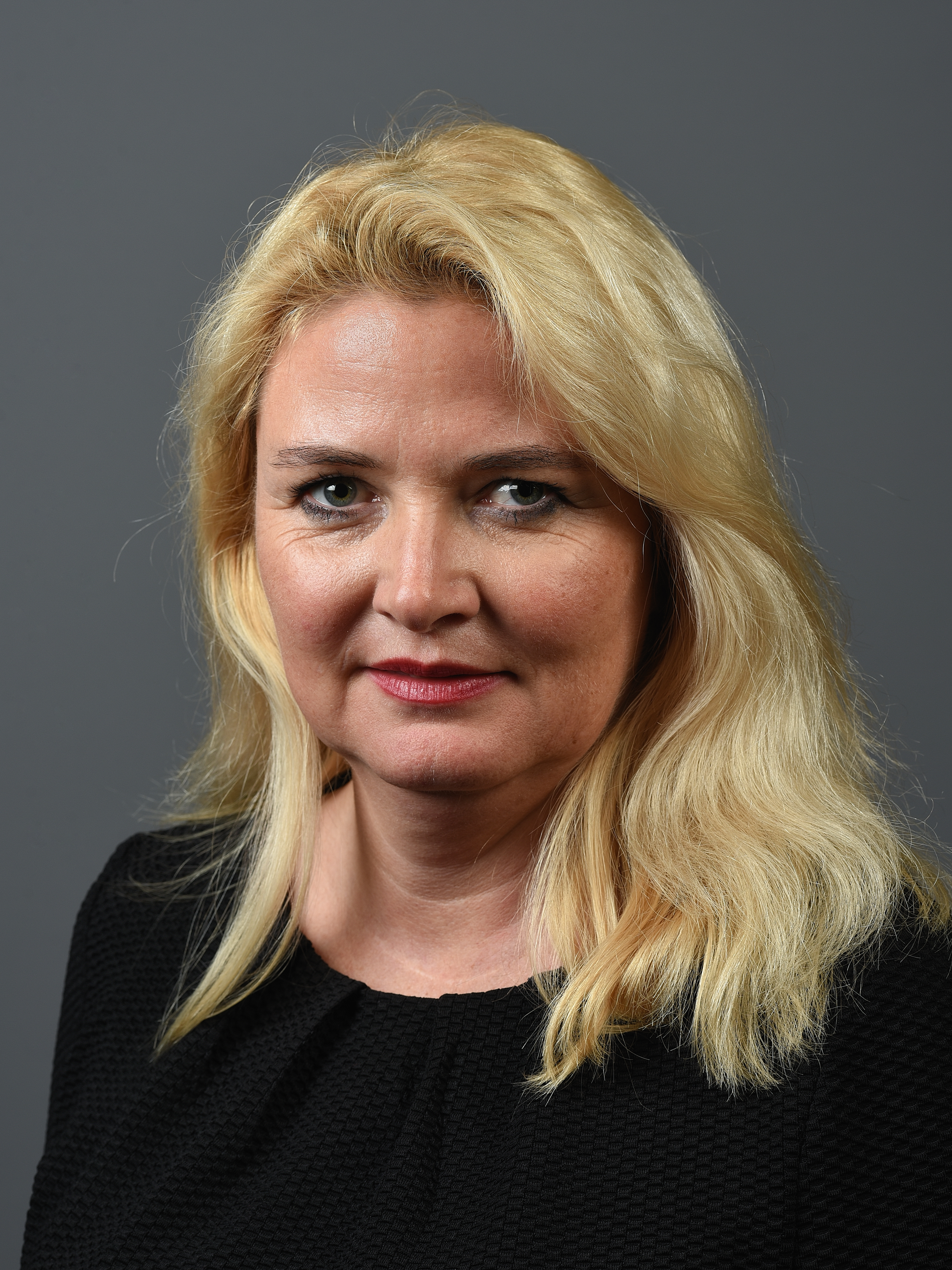

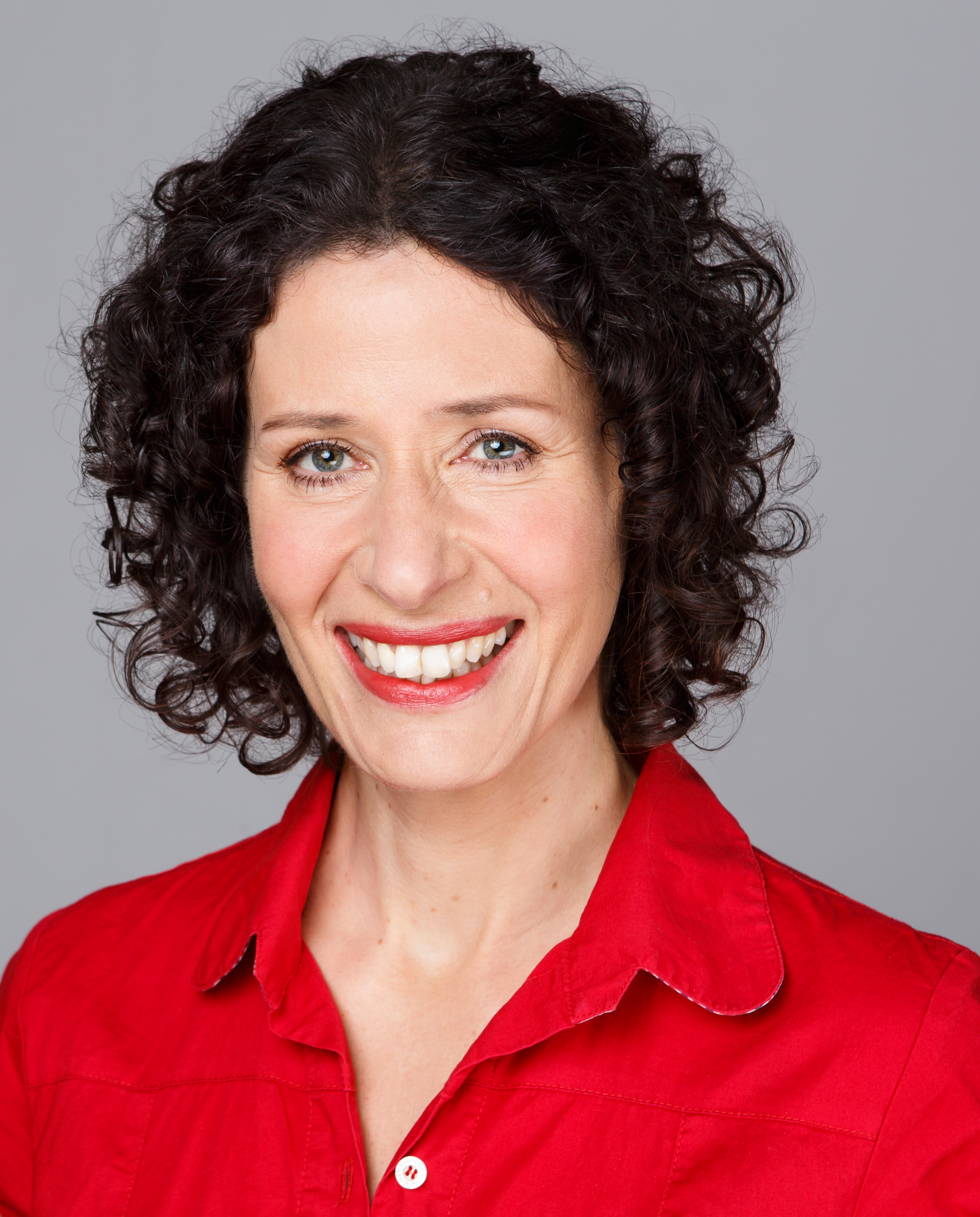

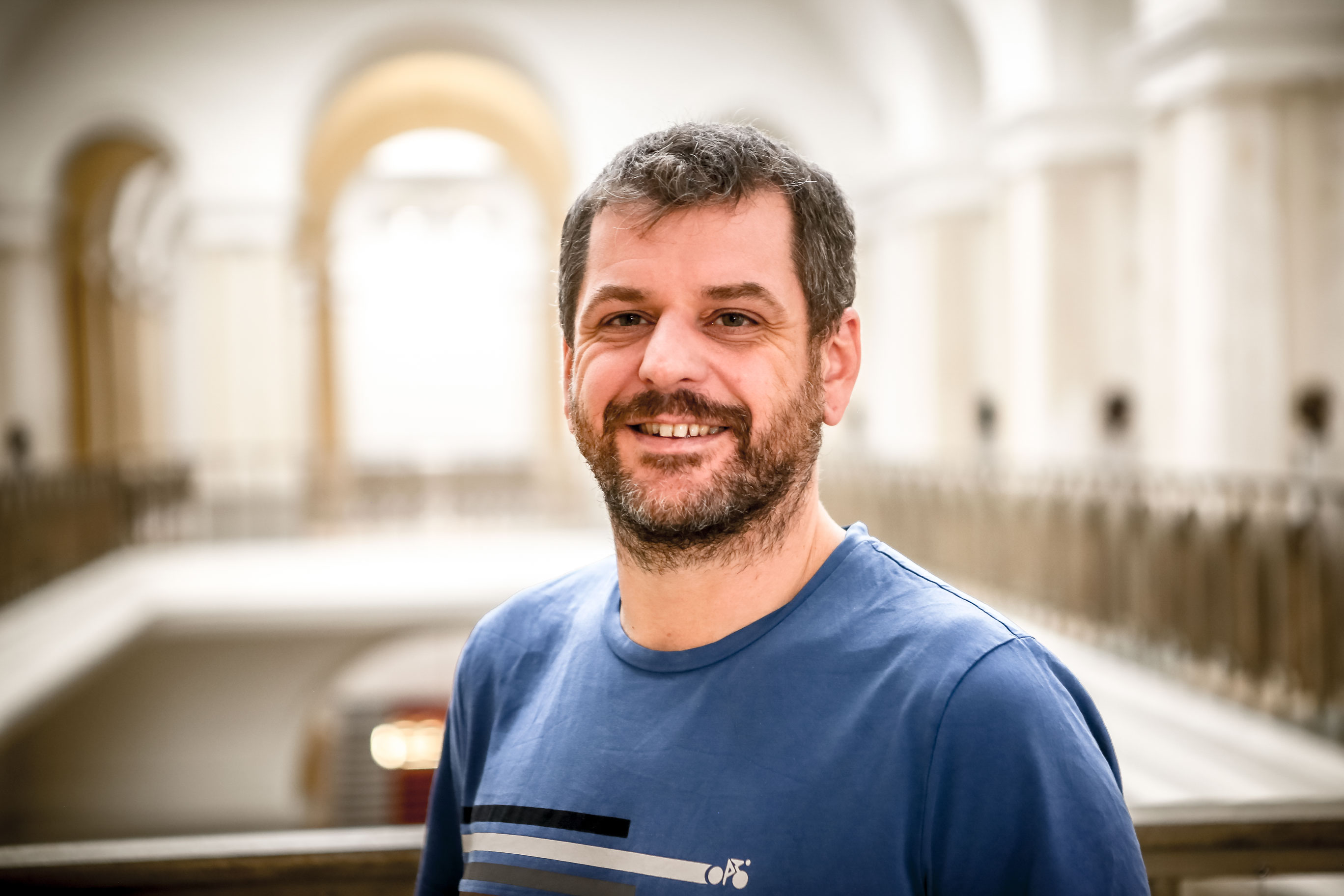

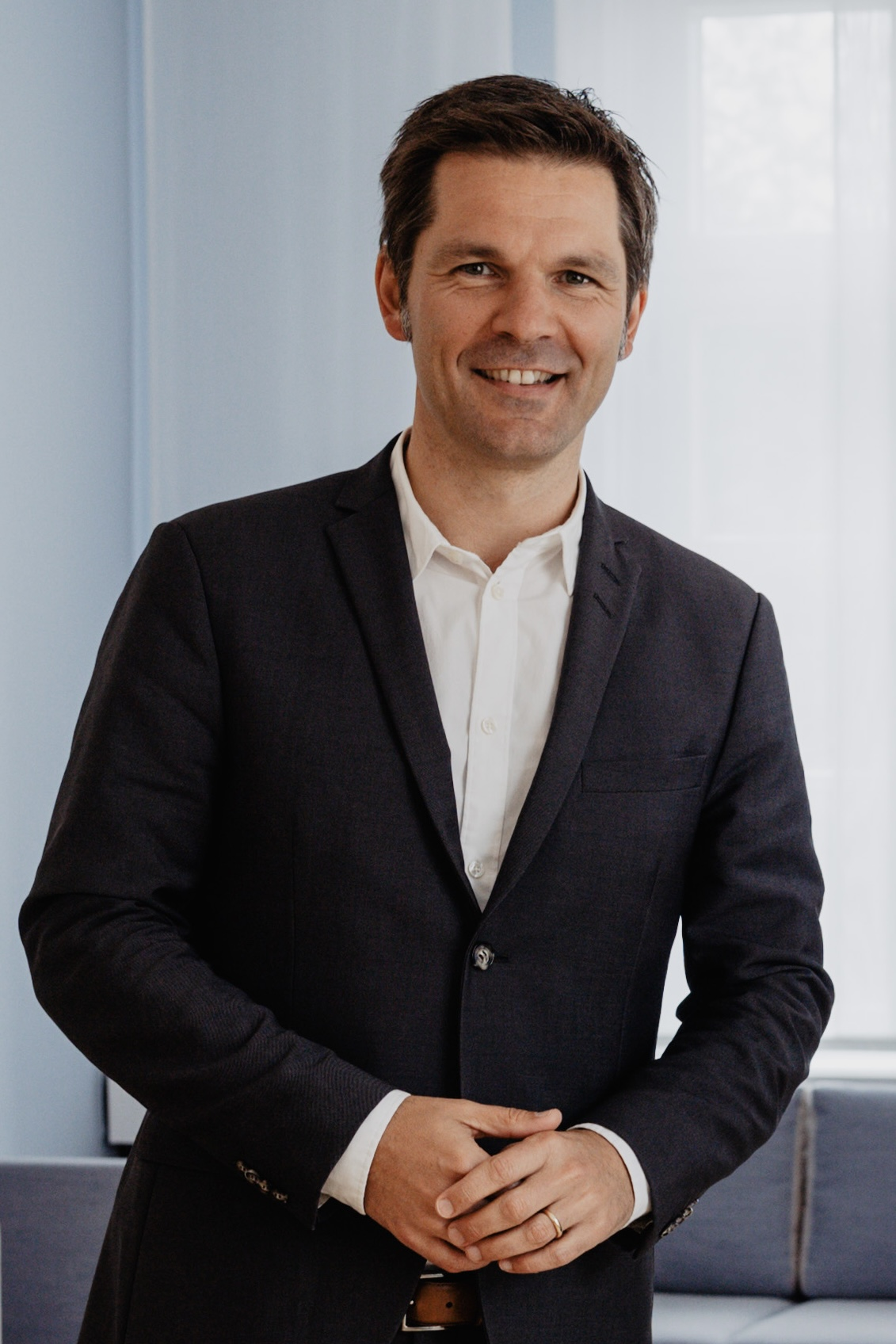
	First party	Second party	Third party
Candidate	Elif Eralp	Stefan Evers	Kristin Brinker
Party	Linke	CDU	AfD
Last election	22 seats, 12.2%	52 seats, 28.2%	17 seats, 9.1%
Seats won	45	33	29
Seat change	▲23	▼19	▲12
Popular vote	468,060	342,516	296,601
Percentage	25.7%	18.8%	16.3%
Swing	▲13.4pp	▼9.5pp	▲7.2pp
	Fourth party	Fifth party
Candidate	Bettina Jarasch & Werner Graf	Steffen Krach
Party	Greens	SPD
Last election	34 seats, 18.4%	34 seats, 18.4%
Seats won	25	21
Seat change	▼9	▼13
Popular vote	260,700	220,939
Percentage	14.3%	12.1%
Swing	▼4.1pp	▼6.3pp
- Results for single-member constituencies and party list.
Government before election
Wegner senate
CDU–SPD
Elected Government
TBD

The 2026 Berlin state election was held on 20 September 2026 to elect the 20th Abgeordnetenhaus of Berlin. The 2026 Mecklenburg-Vorpommern state election took place on the same day, two weeks after the 2026 Saxony-Anhalt state election.

Due to numerous irregularities in the 2021 Berlin state election, it was ruled invalid and repeated in 2023 in which members were elected only for the remainder of the term. Kai Wegner has served as Governing Mayor of Berlin since April 2023, leading the CDU-SPD Wegner senate, but has received criticism and was not seeking re-election as mayor.

The parties of the outgoing government—the Christian Democratic Union (CDU) and the Social Democratic Party (SPD)—as well as the Greens, lost about a third of their support. Meanwhile, The Left and the Alternative for Germany (AfD) doubled their share, and the Sahra Wagenknecht Alliance (BSW) failed to secure any seats.

The Left became the largest party in a state for the second time, after the 2019 Thuringian state election. Since the AfD is subject to the German firewall policy, and the CDU also rejects The Left, three other parties need to cooperate to form a coalition. Both the SPD and the Greens have signalled a willingness to join a coalition with The Left. This was the first time since the 1990 Berlin state election that the SPD or CDU did not finish first.

== Election date ==
The Berlin parliament did not decide to dissolve itself. The date of the election for the 20th Abgeordnetenhaus of Berlin was set to 20 September 2026. The Berlin Constitution stipulates that a regular election must occur no earlier than 56 months and no later than 59 months after the start of the Abgeordnetenhaus's legislative period. The 19th Abgeordnetenhaus of Berlin was constituted on November 4, 2021.

== Electoral system ==
The Abgeordnetenhaus is elected via mixed-member proportional representation. 78 members are elected in single-member constituencies via first-past-the-post voting. 52 members are then allocated using compensatory proportional representation, distributed based on each party's statewide voteshare. Parties can submit either a single statewide list, or one in each of Berlin's twelve boroughs. Voters have two votes: the "first vote" for candidates in single-member constituencies, and the "second vote" for party lists, which are used to fill the proportional seats. The statutory size of the Abgeordnetenhaus is 130 members, but if overhang seats are present, proportional leveling seats will be added to ensure proportionality. An electoral threshold of 5% of valid votes is applied to the Abgeordnetenhaus; parties that fall below this threshold are excluded from the Abgeordnetenhaus – except if they win at least one single-member constituency, in which case they are exempt from said threshold and will be eligible for seats.

== Background ==
Results of Berlin state elections. Since turnout dropped under 70% in 1995, abstentions (Nichtwähler) have a much higher share than any party.

With 28% of votes in the 2023 Berlin repeat state election, the opposition Christian Democratic Union (CDU) grew by over ten percentage points and emerged as the largest party by a wide margin, the first time it had done so since the 1999 Berlin state election. All three governing parties declined; the SPD suffered its worst result in over a century with 18.4%, and only barely remained ahead of the Greens by a margin of 53 votes. The Left also slipped to 12%. The Alternative for Germany (AfD) recorded a small upswing to 9%, while the Free Democratic Party (FDP) fell to 4.6% and lost all their seats. Overall, the incumbent government retained a reduced majority. The CDU claimed a mandate to govern given its first-place result, while mayor Franziska Giffey committed to remaining in government. The Left called for a renewal of the outgoing coalition. After various talks between parties, the SPD and CDU voted at the beginning of March to begin negotiations for a grand coalition. CDU leader Kai Wegner was approved as mayor on 27 April after three rounds of voting.

== Campaign ==
=== Wegner replacement ===
Wegner received heavy criticism for his lack of presence and poor communicative response to the 3 January 2026 arson attack on the Berlin power grid, especially after it was revealed he spent part of the day playing tennis with his partner Katharina Günther-Wünsch instead of handling the crisis. The scandal caused tension inside the coalition and opposition parties accused him of lying about his whereabouts that day. Der Tagesspiegel reported on 7 July, citing the Senate Chancellery, that Wegner had not made any official phone calls related to the blackout until 12:45 p.m., nearly seven hours after the attack; this contradicted his previous public statement that he first began coordinating a response around 8 a.m. After this, internal anger from his party intensified, and on 10 July Wegner stepped down as the CDU's lead candidate for this election. He refused to resign from office and remained the CDU's constituency candidate in his district of Spandau 5. However, he ruled out serving in the next Senate if the CDU end up in government. On the evening of 10 July, Finance Senator Stefan Evers was named as Wegner's replacement.

=== Police investigation into Krach ===
On 9 September, the Hanover public prosecutor's office executed three search warrants against properties related to SPD lead candidate Steffen Krach; police searched his apartment in Berlin, as well as SPD offices in Berlin and the Hanover Region government offices. Though the office declined to comment on an ongoing investigation, reporting from Der Tagesspiegel indicated it was on suspicion of bribery.

Krach told Rundfunk Berlin-Brandenburg in an interview that evening that he suspected this was the basis of the investigation. Krach, in his capacity of President of the Hanover Region from 2021 through the beginning of 2026, was chair of the supervisory board of its municipal hospitals and oversaw the sale of property of one that had been closed. He claimed that one of the two bidders – which he said was the one which lost – made a donation of €9,900 to the Berlin SPD during the process, just under the €10,000 threshold which requires the party to disclose the donor's identity. At this time (December 2025), Krach had been nominated as the Berlin lead candidate but had not yet left his Hanover post. Krach called the implication of accepting a bribe "completely baseless", said he immediately recognized the donation as unacceptable and returned it within 24 hours, and denied ever taking improper donations in a personal or professional capacity. As donations are normally handled only by party financial staff, he said he had specially instructed them to alert him to any coming from Hanover to avoid the appearance of impropriety, and later abstained from the board's decisive vote. The prosecutor's office had searched the losing bidder's offices in May 2026 in a relation to an unspecified "corruption offense", and Krach said awareness of a previous investigation into them ultimately swayed the board's decision.

The Berlin state executive of the SPD held a crisis meeting on the afternoon of 9 September and pronounced their full confidence in Krach as lead candidate. Reporting from RBB later brought Krach's timeline into question: it obtained copies of the relevant receipts and communications which showed the donation was made on 29 December 2025 and returned on 9 January 2026. Krach was only told about the donation on 7 January. However, the Berlin party treasurer backed up his claim that he instructed the donation be returned immediately. Krach stated his intention to continue campaigning in a press conference on 10 September, and confirmed he had support from the SPD parliamentary group, state executive, and federal leader and Vice Chancellor Lars Klingbeil.

In the evening of 10 September, the Hanover public prosecutor's office confirmed to Der Spiegel that there were three active investigations into Krach: two for Vorteilsannahme – "acceptance of benefits", accepting a bribe but without a violation of duty to the public, which is the more severe Bestechlichkeit (corruption) – and one for entering into possible anti-competitive agreements in conjunction with the misappropriation of trade secrets. The spokeswoman said the investigations had started on 3 September and the search warrants had been issued on 7 September. In light of this, Der Tagesspiegel reported that the municipal supervisory authority of Lower Saxony – Krach was still technically in office as president of the Hanover region on unpaid leave – was evaluating opening disciplinary proceedings against him.

After the 29 October opening session of the House of Representatives, at which time Krach received the immunity afforded to all elected legislators, prosecutors disclosed that they had paused the investigations. However, Krach stated he was cooperating and would not oppose a request to the House to lift his immunity. Prosecutors filed such a request with the Senate Administration of Justice on 13 November; the House's Committee on Legal Affairs first takes a statement and votes on a recommendation before sending the request to the full body for a vote.

=== Polls and potential coalitions ===
In the two months before the election, the CDU, AfD, and The Left were all shown as the largest party in at least one poll. Recent election winners were also quite different: SPD had won the invalid 2021 Berlin state election, CDU the repeat 2023 Berlin state election, the Greens the local 2024 European Parliament elections, and The Left prevailed in the local 2025 German federal election. Polls in August suggested that five parties are in the 15% to 20% range, making a continuation of the CDU–SPD grand coalition or any other two-party coalition mathematically impossible. They predict a CDU–SPD–Green Kenya coalition could have a majority, but Green lead candidate Werner Graf has ruled out working with the CDU. A Left–Green–SPD coalition is thus the most likely coalition to command a majority. The same coalition, but led by the SPD (red–red–green coalition), governed Berlin from 2016 through 2023.

The AfD is subject to a firewall policy as all other major parties refuse to work with it, and no other parties are predicted to pass the five-percent election threshold. The federal CDU has also passed a "resolution of incompatibility" prohibiting it or any lower-level party organ from working with The Left. Left lead candidate Elif Eralp has publicly stated a red line condition of entering any coalition is beginning the nationalisation (with reducing compensation) of housing properties owned by large companies, which voters approved by a large margin in the non-binding 2021 Deutsche Wohnen & Co. enteignen referendum. (Article 15 of the Basic Law empowers the government to pass a law allowing it to take over land, natural resources, and means of production for the purposes of socialization with equitable compensation to the owner, though it has never been used before.) Krach responded that he would not agree to this condition and accused The Left of "drawing a red line here because they do not even want to govern and instead continue as maximum opposition". For his part, Graf said his party felt bound by the referendum and called on the two red parties to settle their differences and "draw green lines" instead.

== Parties ==
The table below lists parties represented in the 19th Abgeordnetenhaus of Berlin since 2023.

Name		Ideology	Lead candidate(s)	2023 result		Current
Name		Ideology	Lead candidate(s)	Votes	Seats	
CDU	Christian Democratic Union of Germany; Christlich Demokratische Union Deutschlands	Christian democracy	Stefan Evers	28.2%	52 / 147	52 / 147
SPD	Social Democratic Party of Germany; Sozialdemokratische Partei Deutschlands	Social democracy	Steffen Krach	18.4%	34 / 147	36 / 147
Grüne	Alliance 90/The Greens; Bündnis 90/Die Grünen	Green politics	Werner Graf	18.4%	34 / 147	33 / 147
Linke	The Left; Die Linke	Democratic socialism	Elif Eralp	12.2%	22 / 147	20 / 147
AfD	Alternative for Germany; Alternative für Deutschland	Right-wing populism	Kristin Brinker	9.1%	17 / 147	16 / 147
BSW	Sahra Wagenknecht Alliance; Bündnis Sahra Wagenknecht	Left-conservatism	Alexander King; Michael Lüders	Did not exist		1 / 147

BSW is represented as Alexander King has defected from The Left. All parties represented in the Abgeordnetenhaus are automatically approved to submit a list of candidates without needing to also submit supporting signatures while minor parties must accompany their lists with 2,200 signatures. All approved parties may decide to submit one statewide list or a borough list in one or more of Berlin's 12 boroughs. Of the established parties, the CDU, Left, and SPD filed borough lists in all boroughs, while the AfD, BSW and Greens filed one statewide list.

The following minor parties were approved to run in the election:

- Mountain Party, the ÜberParty (Bergpartei) – borough list only in Friedrichshain-Kreuzberg
- German Communist Party (DKP)
- Free Democratic Party (FDP)
- The Homeland (Heimat) – borough lists only in Lichtenberg and Treptow-Köpenick (Formerly the National Democratic Party) (NPD)
- Ecological Democratic Party (ÖDP)
- The Party for Labour, Rule of Law, Animal Protection, Promotion of Elites and Grassroots Democratic Initiative (Die PARTEI)
- Party of Progress (PdF)
- Socialist Equality Party (SGP)
- Party Human Climate Animal Protection (Tierschutzpartei)
- The Urbans – A Hip-Hop Party (Die Urbane)
- Volt Germany

The following minor parties submitted a state list and were not approved because they did not meet the signature requirement:

- Grassroots Democratic Party (dieBasis)
- Free Voters (FW)
- European Realistic Disobedience Front (MERA25)
- Pirate Party

== Opinion polls ==
Local regression of polls conducted.

Polling firm	Fieldwork date	Sample size	CDU	SPD	Grüne	Linke	AfD	FDP	BSW	Others	Lead
2026 state election	20 Sep 2026	–	18.8	12.1	14.3	25.7	16.3	2.5	4.7	5.6	6.9
Forschungsgruppe Wahlen	20 Sep 2026	–	20	12	15.5	26	13.5	–	5	8	6
Infratest dimap	20 Sep 2026	–	20	12	15	24.5	16	–	5	7.5	4.5
Geostrategy	14–18 Sep 2026	1,000	19	12	14	21	20	3	5	6	1
Forschungsgruppe Wahlen	14–17 Sep 2026	1,611	20	12	15	22	18	–	4	9	2
Civey	3–17 Sep 2026	3,000	20	12	16	21	18	2.5	4	6.5	1
INSA	10–16 Sep 2026	1,000	20	12	15	21	18	–	5	9	1
INSA	7–14 Sep 2026	1,000	20	12	16	20	18	3	5	6	Tie
Forschungsgruppe Wahlen	7–10 Sep 2026	1,100	21	10	16	23	17	–	3	10	2
Civey	27 Aug – 10 Sep 2026	3,000	20	13	16	19	18	3	4	7	1
Infratest dimap	7–9 Sep 2026	1,527	20	12	16	21	18	–	4	9	1
INSA	26 Aug – 2 Sep 2026	1,000	20	15	15	19	18	3	3	7	1
Infratest dimap	27–31 Aug 2026	1,279	21	11	18	19	18	–	4	9	2
Unnamed pollster for BSW	21–26 Aug 2026	1,091	13.5	11.8	15.4	22.3	21.1	4.2	5.5	6.1	1.2
Civey	13–27 Aug 2026	3,000	19	13	15	20	18	4	4	7	1
Geostrategy	10–14 Aug 2026	1,000	19	14	15	20	19	3	4	6	1
Forsa	4–18 Aug 2026	1,535	18	12	16	22	18	3	4	7	4
INSA	7–13 Aug 2026	1,000	20	15	16	19	17	3	3	7	1
Civey	20 Jul – 3 Aug 2026	3,000	19	12	17	21	18	3	3	7	2
INSA (Note: Commissioned by the Nius, a right-wing populist news portal, which is not a member of the German Press Council and thus is not subject to its ethical standards. Other INSA polls that are listed are commissioned by Bild.)	14–21 Jul 2026	1,000	18	13	16	18	19	4	4	8	1
Infratest dimap	13–15 Jul 2026	1,147	20	12	17	22	16	3	3	7	2
Civey	25 Jun – 9 Jul 2026	3,000	19	13	17	19	17	4	3	8	Tie
Infratest dimap	25–29 Jun 2026	1,165	17	13	19	20	18	3	3	7	1
INSA	4–8 May 2026	1,000	20	16	15	15	18	4	4	8	2
Infratest dimap	23–27 Apr 2026	1,155	19	14	18	18	18	3	3	7	1
INSA	7–14 Apr 2026	1,000	21	17	15	15	17	3	4	8	4
INSA	17–24 Feb 2026	1,000	22	16	15	15	17	4	4	7	5
Infratest dimap	12–14 Jan 2026	1,173	22	14	16	18	17	–	3	10	4
INSA	7–14 Jan 2026	1,000	22	17	14	17	16	3	4	7	5
Infratest dimap	13–17 Nov 2025	1,185	22	13	16	19	16	–	4	10	3
INSA	21–28 Oct 2025	1,100	23	16	14	17	15	4	5	6	6
Infratest dimap	12–16 Jun 2025	1,148	25	14	15	19	13	–	4	10	6
INSA	13–20 May 2025	1,000	24	17	15	13	13	3	7	8	7
Federal election	23 Feb 2025	–	18.3	15.1	16.8	19.9	15.2	3.8	6.6	4.2	1.6
Infratest dimap	14–18 Nov 2024	1,179	27	12	20	6	15	4	7	9	7
INSA	1–7 Jul 2024	1,000	26	18	15	7	12	4	12	6	8
European Parliament election	9 Jun 2024	–	17.6	13.2	19.6	7.3	11.6	4.3	8.7	17.7	2.0
Infratest dimap	18–22 Apr 2024	1,174	27	15	20	10	12	3	6	7	7
INSA	22–29 Jan 2024	1,000	29	16	17	10	13	4	–	11	12
Infratest dimap	12–16 Oct 2023	1,159	29	15	19	10	15	4	–	8	10
INSA	18–26 Sep 2023	1,000	26	17	18	10	14	5	–	10	8
Wahlkreisprognose	25 Jul – 2 Aug 2023	1,000	24.5	16	16.5	13.5	16	4	–	9.5	8
INSA	27 Mar – 3 Apr 2023	1,000	30	18	18	11	9	5	–	9	12
2023 state election	12 Feb 2023	N/A	28.2	18.4	18.4	12.2	9.1	4.6	–	9.0	9.8

=== Hypothetical direct election of mayor ===
Polling firm	Fieldwork date	Sample size	Evers CDU	Krach SPD	Graf Greens	Eralp Left	Brinker AfD	None/ Undecided	Lead
Forschungsgruppe Wahlen	14–17 Sep 2026	1,611	24	–	12	25	–	39	14
Forschungsgruppe Wahlen	7–10 Sep 2026	1,100	25	–	9	23	–	43	18
Infratest dimap	27–31 Aug 2026	1,279	13	9	4	13	7	54	41
Forsa	4–18 Aug 2026	1,535	15	10	6	16	10	43	27
Civey	22 Jul – 7 Aug 2026	1,500	20	14	9	11	15	31	11
Infratest dimap	25–29 Jun 2026	1,147	11	7	3	9	5	65	54

=== West Berlin ===
Polling firm	Fieldwork date	Sample size	CDU	SPD	Grüne	Linke	AfD	FDP	BSW	Others	Lead
2026 state election	20 Sep 2026	–	21.9	14.0	15.5	24.1	12.7	2.9	3.9	5.1	2.2
Infratest dimap	7–9 Sep 2026	–	23	14	18	18	15	–	3	9	5
Infratest dimap	26 Aug – 2 Sep 2026	–	24	13	19	16	15	–	3	10	5
Infratest dimap	12–16 Oct 2023	–	31	17	20	8	13	4	–	7	11
2023 state election	12 Feb 2023	–	31.1	19.9	19.8	9.0	6.8	7.0	–	6.4	11.2

=== East Berlin ===
Polling firm	Fieldwork date	Sample size	CDU	Linke	SPD	Grüne	AfD	FDP	BSW	Others	Lead
2026 state election	20 Sep 2026	–	14.7	27.8	9.6	12.6	21.0	2.1	5.8	6.5	6.8
Infratest dimap	7–9 Sep 2026	–	15	25	10	13	22	–	6	9	3
Infratest dimap	26 Aug – 2 Sep 2026	–	17	22	8	16	22	–	6	9	Tie
Infratest dimap	12–16 Oct 2023	–	26	12	14	18	17	3	–	10	8
2023 state election	12 Feb 2023	–	24.3	16.6	16.4	16.4	12.2	3.7	–	10.4	7.7

== Results ==
Results for the list vote by party

Results of the party list vote by voting precinct

Voter turnout was 74.2%, nearly as high as in 2021 when the 2021 German federal election was held concurrently.

Party	Constituency			Party list			Total seats	+/–
Party	Votes	%	Seats	Votes	%	Seats	Total seats	+/–
The Left (Linke)	435,893	24.04	28	468,391	25.66	17	45	+23
Christian Democratic Union (CDU)	367,377	20.26	26	342,746	18.77	7	33	–19
Alternative for Germany (AfD)	289,441	15.97	13	296,718	16.25	16	29	+12
Alliance 90/The Greens (Grüne)	297,100	16.39	10	260,896	14.29	15	25	–9
Social Democratic Party (SPD)	248,721	13.72	1	221,116	12.11	20	21	–13
Sahra Wagenknecht Alliance (BSW)	75,704	4.18	0	86,350	4.73	0	0	New
Free Democratic Party (FDP)	40,410	2.23	0	46,384	2.54	0	0	0
Human Environment Animal Protection Party (Tierschutzpartei)	10,236	0.56	0	38,678	2.12	0	0	0
Volt Germany (Volt)	40,638	2.24	0	37,950	2.08	0	0	0
Die PARTEI	4,804	0.26	0	13,349	0.73	0	0	0
Party of Progress (PdF)				5,700	0.31	0	0	New
Ecological Democratic Party (ÖDP)				2,560	0.14	0	0	0
German Communist Party (DKP)	252	0.01	0	2,051	0.11	0	0	0
Die Urbane. Eine HipHop Partei (Die Urbane)				1,518	0.08	0	0	New
Socialist Equality Party (SGP)				663	0.04	0	0	0
Die Heimat				521	0.03	0	0	New
Bergpartei, die ÜberPartei (B*)	44	0.00	0	81	0.00	0	0	0
MERA25	374	0.02	0				0	New
Mieterpartei	289	0.02	0				0	New
Democratic Left (DL)	57	0.00	0				0	0
Feminist Party of Germany	57	0.00	0				0	New
Independents	1,487	0.08	0				0	0
Total	1,812,884	100.00	78	1,825,672	100.00	75	153	–6
Valid votes	1,812,884	98.19		1,825,672	98.88			
Invalid/blank votes	33,460	1.81		20,672	1.12			
Total votes	1,846,344	100.00		1,846,344	100.00			
Registered voters/turnout	2,487,318	74.23		2,487,318	74.23			
Source: State Returning Officer

Popular vote
LINKE	25.66%
CDU	18.77%
AfD	16.25%
GRÜNE	14.29%
SPD	12.11%
BSW	4.73%
FDP	2.54%
Other	5.65%

Landtag seats
LINKE	29.41%
CDU	21.57%
AfD	18.95%
GRÜNE	16.34%
SPD	13.73%

	SPD	CDU/CSU	Linke	Grüne	FDP	AfD	Others
West Berlin	14.0	21.9	24.1	15.5	2.9	12.7	11.8
East Berlin	9.6	14.7	27.8	12.6	2.1	20.9	12.4

=== Results by constituency ===
No.	Constituency		Turnout	Winner				Runner-up				Margin
No.	Constituency		%	Candidate	Party	Votes	%	Candidate	Party	Votes	%	Margin
1	Mitte	1	79.1	Silke Gebel	Greens	7,220	28.4	Anna Eiling	Left	6,409	25.2	811
2	Mitte	2	74.3	Leonard Diederich	Left	6,978	28.2	Lucas Schaal	CDU	4,918	19.8	2,060
3	Mitte	3	75.2	Jian Omar	Greens	6,647	29.0	Tobias Schulze	Left	5,615	24.5	1,032
4	Mitte	4	72.8	Taylan Kurt	Greens	7,737	36.6	Jacqueline Sanehy	Left	6,550	31.0	1,187
5	Mitte	5	66.9	Andreas Umgelter	Left	6,631	36.4	Alexandra Bendzko	Greens	2,745	15.1	3,886
6	Mitte	6	64.3	Martha Kleedörfer	Left	8,170	46.2	Tuba Bozkurt	Greens	3,863	21.8	4,307
7	Mitte	7	66.0	Deike Janssen	Left	8,235	43.4	Tarek Massalme	Greens	3,420	18.0	4,815
8	Friedrichshain-Kreuzberg	1	68.6	Elif Eralp	Left	11,185	50.4	Kübra Beydaș	Greens	3,817	17.2	7,368
9	Friedrichshain-Kreuzberg	2	80.1	Michael Efler	Left	9,962	37.1	Katrin Schmidberger	Greens	8,990	33.5	972
10	Friedrichshain-Kreuzberg	3	79.4	Kerstin Wolter-Ehling	Left	11,511	42.2	Enad Altaweel	Greens	7,665	28.1	3,846
11	Friedrichshain-Kreuzberg	4	76.2	Damiano Valgolio	Left	10,474	39.1	Antje Kapek	Greens	5,240	19.5	5,234
12	Friedrichshain-Kreuzberg	5	81.8	Ekkehard Spiegel	Left	11,299	40.9	Vasili Franco	Greens	7,630	27.6	3,669
13	Pankow	1	75.0	Johannes Kraft	CDU	7,281	28.3	Christian Buchholz	AfD	6,865	26.7	416
14	Pankow	2	79.5	Lars Bocian	CDU	6,605	25.0	Jan-Philip Streeck	AfD	5,518	20.9	1,087
15	Pankow	3	80.1	Christian Zebisch	Left	7,232	26.0	Oda Hassepaß	Greens	7,069	25.5	163
16	Pankow	4	75.6	Herbert Mohr	AfD	4,971	22.9	Devran Bașbolat	Left	4,627	21.3	344
17	Pankow	5	78.1	Enja Springob	Left	6,806	28.1	Louis Krüger	Greens	5,339	22.1	1,467
18	Pankow	6	82.7	Maria Bigos	Left	8,593	32.4	Sunčica Klaas	Greens	8,096	30.6	497
19	Pankow	7	79.0	Niklas Schrader	Left	7,616	32.1	Can Aru	Greens	6,159	25.9	1,457
20	Pankow	8	82.5	Daniela Billig	Greens	8,502	34.3	Gloria Viagra	Left	6,626	26.7	1,876
21	Pankow	9	78.3	Maximilian Schirmer	Left	7,423	28.1	Tino Schopf	SPD	6,668	25.3	755
22	Charlottenburg-Wilmersdorf	1	69.8	Niklas Schenker	Left	4,904	24.8	Nicola Aleksander Kaufmann	SPD	4,009	20.3	895
23	Charlottenburg-Wilmersdorf	2	77.5	Ariturel Hack	CDU	7,859	33.1	Corinna Balkow	Greens	4,484	18.9	3,375
24	Charlottenburg-Wilmersdorf	3	78.9	Petra Vandrey	Greens	6,243	25.7	Kian Niroomand	SPD	4,766	19.6	1,477
25	Charlottenburg-Wilmersdorf	4	75.2	Aldona Niemczyk	CDU	5,894	24.5	Christoph Wapler	Greens	5,803	24.1	91
26	Charlottenburg-Wilmersdorf	5	75.6	Sandra Khalatbari	CDU	8,123	35.5	Anna Melnik	Greens	3,763	16.4	4,360
27	Charlottenburg-Wilmersdorf	6	76.8	Jakob Zimmer	Greens	7,100	29.6	Peer Mock-Stümer	CDU	5,733	23.9	1,367
28	Charlottenburg-Wilmersdorf	7	78.9	Felor Badenberg	CDU	6,581	26.1	Isabel Blecher	Greens	5,617	22.3	964
29	Spandau	1	65.8	Tommy Tabor	AfD	5,184	23.1	Bettina Meißner	CDU	5,150	22.9	34
30	Spandau	2	64.1	Andreas Otti	AfD	4,212	23.8	Ersin Nas	CDU	3,789	21.4	423
31	Spandau	3	65.6	Thomas Wulfes	Left	4,569	21.3	Kerstin Brauner	CDU	4,327	20.1	242
32	Spandau	4	70.0	Heiko Melzer	CDU	6,279	29.5	Robert Mickley	AfD	4,915	23.1	1,364
33	Spandau	5	76.2	Kai Wegner	CDU	7,575	31.8	Susanne Drescher	SPD	4,611	19.4	2,964
34	Steglitz-Zehlendorf	1	79.9	Tonka Wojahn	Greens	6,219	24.6	Claudia Wein	CDU	6,147	24.3	72
35	Steglitz-Zehlendorf	2	77.4	Tom Cywinski	CDU	5,361	22.7	Daniel Eliasson	Greens	4,848	20.6	513
36	Steglitz-Zehlendorf	3	81.8	Jens Hoffmann	CDU	8,398	33.3	Rena Peterson	Greens	5,275	20.9	3,123
37	Steglitz-Zehlendorf	4	77.4	Cornelia Seibeld	CDU	7,782	32.7	Klara Ruhl	Greens	4,126	17.3	3,656
38	Steglitz-Zehlendorf	5	74.3	Marco Hahnfeld	CDU	6,264	28.5	Mirjam Golm	SPD	3,692	16.8	2,572
39	Steglitz-Zehlendorf	6	83.0	Christoph Wegener	CDU	8,840	33.7	Michael Gaedicke	Greens	5,599	21.3	3,241
40	Steglitz-Zehlendorf	7	83.7	Stephan Standfuß	CDU	9,459	38.2	Silke Lambeck	Greens	5,150	20.8	4,309
41	Tempelhof-Schöneberg	1	76.7	Sebastian Walter	Greens	7,275	27.4	Elisabeth Staudt	Left	6,915	26.1	360
42	Tempelhof-Schöneberg	2	78.1	Martina Zander-Rade	Greens	7,602	29.4	Asya Șenyüz	Left	7,045	27.2	557
43	Tempelhof-Schöneberg	3	81.8	Christoph Störmer	Greens	7,955	28.1	Orkan Özdemir	SPD	7,405	26.2	550
44	Tempelhof-Schöneberg	4	75.3	Sarah Bremer	Left	6,171	25.5	Aferdita Suka	Greens	5,929	24.5	242
45	Tempelhof-Schöneberg	5	70.2	Roman Simon	CDU	5,682	24.9	Christoph Böltes	Left	4,492	19.7	1,190
46	Tempelhof-Schöneberg	6	72.5	Scott Körber	CDU	7,061	31.8	Karsten Franck	AfD	4,349	19.6	2,712
47	Tempelhof-Schöneberg	7	74.3	Christian Zander	CDU	8,291	35.0	Karl-Heinz Turban	AfD	4,620	19.5	3,671
48	Neukölln	1	73.8	Vanessa Emde	Left	10,731	46.2	André Schulze	Greens	6,026	25.9	4,705
49	Neukölln	2	71.1	Philipp-Martin Dehne	Left	11,218	50.0	Bahar Haghanipour	Greens	5,263	23.4	5,955
50	Neukölln	3	64.0	Rouzbeh Taheri	Left	8,738	41.2	Christina Hilmer-Benedict	Greens	3,162	14.9	5,576
51	Neukölln	4	64.5	Christopher Förster	CDU	5,282	26.1	Marcel Hopp	SPD	4,846	23.9	436
52	Neukölln	5	70.9	Robbin Juhnke	CDU	6,473	28.2	Julian Potthast	AfD	4,698	20.5	1,775
53	Neukölln	6	72.5	Olaf Schenk	CDU	6,418	27.7	Franziska Giffey	SPD	6,103	26.3	315
54	Treptow-Köpenick	1	76.2	Moritz Warnke	Left	8,762	40.7	Catrin Wahlen	Greens	3,260	15.1	5,502
55	Treptow-Köpenick	2	74.5	Lisa Pfitzmann	Left	7,203	35.6	Janine Paetzel	AfD	4,197	20.7	3,006
56	Treptow-Köpenick	3	75.5	Lars Düsterhöft	SPD	5,746	26.0	Fabian Ulrich	Left	5,480	24.8	266
57	Treptow-Köpenick	4	75.0	Alexander Bertram	AfD	7,570	31.5	Stefan Evers	CDU	5,889	24.5	1,681
58	Treptow-Köpenick	5	75.6	Denis Henkel	AfD	5,721	24.9	Loic Kliemann	Left	5,639	24.6	82
59	Treptow-Köpenick	6	75.5	Martin Trefzer	AfD	6,500	29.7	Eda Terkan	Left	5,112	23.4	1,388
60	Treptow-Köpenick	7	80.2	Hans Kromrey	Left	6,736	26.7	Maik Penn	CDU	6,215	24.6	521
61	Marzahn-Hellersdorf	1	61.8	Gunnar Lindemann	AfD	8,585	45.1	Björn Tielebein	Left	4,370	23.0	4,215
62	Marzahn-Hellersdorf	2	66.2	Anneliese Dummer	AfD	7,663	35.7	Sarah Bigall	Left	5,138	23.9	2,525
63	Marzahn-Hellersdorf	3	62.6	Jeannette Auricht	AfD	9,060	43.4	Nadine Jüngling	Left	4,797	23.0	4,263
64	Marzahn-Hellersdorf	4	75.0	Martin Koblischke	AfD	6,750	26.4	Johannes Martin	CDU	6,145	24.0	605
65	Marzahn-Hellersdorf	5	83.8	Katharina Günther-Wünsch	CDU	8,890	31.6	Thomas Harder	AfD	6,971	24.7	1,919
66	Marzahn-Hellersdorf	6	67.2	Jörn Geißler	AfD	6,888	33.9	Alexander Herrmann	CDU	5,804	28.5	1,084
67	Lichtenberg	1	68.2	Stephan Knaute	AfD	7,536	33.6	Danny Freymark	CDU	6,938	30.9	598
68	Lichtenberg	2	72.8	Martin Pätzold	CDU	6,622	28.3	Marianne Kleinert	AfD	6,260	26.8	362
69	Lichtenberg	3	67.9	Claudia Engelmann	Left	7,304	32.9	Florian Beckert	AfD	5,589	25.2	1,715
70	Lichtenberg	4	73.2	Antonio Leonhardt	Left	9,212	38.4	Burkhard Knoll	AfD	4,215	17.5	4,997
71	Lichtenberg	5	72.7	Hendrikje Klein	Left	9,159	39.3	Matthias Ebert	AfD	5,017	21.5	4,142
72	Lichtenberg	6	80.1	Julia Behrens	Left	8,080	31.3	Lilia Usik	CDU	4,793	18.6	3,287
73	Reinickendorf	1	62.5	Pilar Caballero Alvarez	Left	4,630	27.0	Burkard Dregger	CDU	3,508	20.5	1,122
74	Reinickendorf	2	66.3	Felix Schönebeck	CDU	5,985	32.1	Christopher Marcel Wiedenhaupt	AfD	3,864	20.7	2,121
75	Reinickendorf	3	79.7	Niklas Graßelt	CDU	8,047	34.3	Samuel Märkt	SPD	4,018	17.1	4,029
76	Reinickendorf	4	72.2	Tomasz Klon	CDU	5,946	26.6	Rolf Wiedenhaupt	AfD	4,356	19.5	1,590
77	Reinickendorf	5	61.1	Carsten Ubbelohde	AfD	4,383	26.8	Matea Krolo	CDU	3,913	23.9	470
78	Reinickendorf	6	84.4	Richard Gamp	CDU	8,927	36.7	Klara Josephine Schedlich	Greens	4,469	18.4	4,458

=== Electorate ===
The electorate statistics, based on post-election surveys conducted by Infratest dimap, are as follows. (Note: Figures for "Other" are calculated as the remainder after the parties individually reported by Infratest dimap and may therefore be affected by rounding.)

Demographic	CDU	SPD	Grüne	Linke	AfD	FDP	BSW	Other
Total vote	18.8%	12.1%	14.3%	25.7%	16.3%	2.5%	4.7%	5.7%
Sex
Men	20%	11%	14%	23%	19%	3%	4%	6%
Women	17%	13%	15%	28%	14%	2%	5%	6%
Age
18–24 years old	8%	7%	11%	43%	12%	3%	6%	10%
25–34 years old	6%	6%	13%	49%	9%	3%	5%	9%
35–44 years old	11%	9%	18%	31%	15%	3%	4%	9%
45–59 years old	19%	11%	18%	20%	20%	3%	4%	5%
60–69 years old	24%	14%	13%	16%	23%	2%	5%	3%
70+ years old	33%	21%	10%	15%	12%	2%	5%	2%
Employment status
Workers	10%	6%	8%	26%	30%	5%	9%	6%
Employees	14%	11%	16%	29%	16%	3%	4%	7%
Pensioners	30%	19%	9%	16%	16%	2%	5%	3%
Self-employed	21%	11%	17%	26%	13%	4%	4%	4%
Education
Lower secondary education	22%	18%	5%	16%	26%	3%	4%	6%
Higher secondary education	20%	12%	7%	19%	28%	2%	6%	6%
University degree	18%	11%	19%	30%	10%	3%	4%	5%
Personal economic situation
Good	21%	13%	16%	24%	14%	3%	4%	5%
Bad	9%	9%	9%	32%	26%	2%	8%	5%

== Aftermath ==
=== Spandau 1 result error ===
On 2 October, while verifying the result, electoral authorities announced there had been an error in the Spandau 1 constituency. Upon a recount the constituency seat went from the CDU's Bettina Meißner to AfD's Tommy Tabor. As it was no longer an overhang seat, this had the effect of removing four leveling seats – one each for SPD and Greens, and two for The Left. With Meißner also losing her seat because she was not elected from the CDU list, this reduced the overall size of the House of Representatives from 158 to 153. The state returning officer told Der Tagesspiegel that the result at one polling station was at issue, and it had been correctly counted on-site but was incorrectly reported by telephone on election night.

=== Controversies surrounding The Left ===
==== Neukölln party incident ====
After the election, The Left faced criticism about the presence of controversial figures at a victory party. Ibrahim Ibrahim, an alleged representative of the Popular Front for the Liberation of Palestine, a Palestinian organisation designated as a terrorist group by the European Union, the United States, and others; Issa Remmo, head of the Remmo clan) as well as members of the Barbakh clan were spotted at the election party of the Neukölln district branch. Both the Remmo clan and the Barbakh clan are large families of Arab origin attributed to organised crime in Germany. The Left's Ferat Koçak, member of the Bundestag for Berlin-Neukölln, and Vanessa Emde, who was newly elected to the state parliament, both were pictured with Ibrahim Ibrahim at the party. Following the election, Issa Remmo's son, Firas Remmo, posted a screenshot of a chat exchange between himself and Koçak, which suggested a close relationship between the two. Koçak wrote, "Respectful greetings back to your father", and also asked Remmo's son to share a video clip of his speeches in the Bundestag.

Representatives from SPD and CDU called for an investigation into the incident and warned of antisemitic tendencies within The Left party. Koçak's explanation of not having known who Remmo or Ibrahim were was deemed "unconvincing" by other parties' representatives. The Green's Andreas Audretsch said: "Issa Remmo is a central figure in organised crime. You don't just bump into him at events." Veteran Left MP Gregor Gysi said in a parliamentary debate that "obviously ... Koçak made a mistake; we are investigating that." Following the controversy, Koçak announced he would give up his seat on the Bundestag's Committee on Internal Affairs and stop making public appearances, although he remains a member of the Bundestag. In a public statement, he repeated that "I am neither a criminal nor do I support organised crime" and admitted to making a mistake. Remmo himself later confirmed his relationship to Koçak, telling Die Welt that "they tore Ferat apart, what was he supposed to do?", and clarifying "of course he knows me". On 9 October, Left leader in the Bundestag Sören Pellmann told the press there would be no further consequences for Koçak and he would be reassigned to another committee to be determined.

==== Debate over a Left-led government ====
The debate and controversy produced competing open letters from Jewish Berliners. On 24 September, 150 Jewish Berliners published a letter defending The Left against accusations of antisemitism and supporting a possible coalition with the SPD and Greens. On 7 October, another initiative, with 190 signatories, called on the SPD and Greens not to form a coalition with The Left, describing antisemitism within the party as a structural problem.

On 22 September, SPD federal leaders Bärbel Bas and Lars Klingbeil warned The Left that it "clearly may not leave one millimeter of space for antisemitism or organised criminals in its ranks", and that the party would be judged thereon. Chancellor Friedrich Merz, who in the meantime had faced controversy and renewed pressure by the SPD over the CDU's position towards the AfD, subsequently went further. On 7 October, he called on the SPD and Greens to "live up to their responsibilities" and use their negative majority to prevent a Left-led government by joining the CDU in Berlin (a black-red-green coalition rather than a red–red–green coalition). Merz's appeal came as The Left, SPD, and Greens were still engaged in talks over forming a government.

The debate prompted a rare public statement from former Chancellor Angela Merkel. In a mid-October 2026 interview with Hessischer Rundfunk, Merkel drew a sharp distinction between The Left and the AfD regarding their adherence to the Basic Law. While she noted that she could not share the views of certain members of The Left, "particularly when it comes to antisemitism", she stated that their views were "by and large, not contrary to our constitution", adding that she would have been open to a compromise with The Left while maintaining that mainstream parties should not cooperate with the AfD.

=== Government formation ===
On 25 September, a large majority of The Left's members voted in favor of beginning exploratory talks with the Greens and SPD. The Greens voted in favor earlier in the week and the SPD did as well the following day, leading to talks for a red–red–green coalition. In light of the Koçak controversy, Greens federal co-leader Franziska Brantner set a condition that her party would not accept a member of The Left as senator of the interior or justice. Both the SPD and Greens demanded The Left make a clear commitment against antisemitism, which the party then inserted into the binding agreement (Mandatsträgervereinbarung, "mandate-holder's agreement") that elected members must sign as a condition of taking their seat. Before beginning exploratory talks, the three parties had initial meetings beginning on 1 October to obtain further assurances from The Left that it was taking concrete steps to distance itself from antisemitism, racism, and organised crime. After two meetings, the parties issued identical statements on 3 October they had agreed on a "common way forward" and would continue working together. Despite this, a third meeting on 7 October apparently led to little in the way of concrete progress. Afterward, Evers called the length of these initial talks indicative of a "serious problem" and emphasised that he was still open to an "alliance of reason" with the SPD and Greens.

On 8 October, the parties announced they had reached an agreement and would proceed to exploratory coalition-building talks. This included a rejection of "any form of antisemitism" and a written commitment to Israel's right to exist, the two-state solution, and Palestinian self-determination. The agreement also provides for a panel of experts which any of the parties' parliamentary leaders may ask to review a potential antisemitic incident. Based on the experts' judgement, the affected party may impose consequences on its offending member up to and including expulsion from its group. In a press conference later that day, Krach said that he expected The Left remove Koçak from its Bundestag group but otherwise referred to the party positively, in particular calling comparisons with the AfD "absolutely wrong ... the AfD is at its core an anti-democratic party. There are three democratic parties standing here in front of you." The next day, an open letter signed by over 100 Left members – led by party executive and Bundestag member Tamara Mazzi and including 16 other Bundestag members and 3 House of Representatives members-elect – condemned the mechanism to handle antisemitic incidents as a "grave political mistake" and claimed that its definition of antisemitism is so broad that any public criticism of the Israeli occupation of Palestine could be subject to discipline. It also criticised the ability of the other parties to begin disciplinary proceedings against Left members and claimed their goal is to divide the party into "good" and "evil" parts.

On 12 October, Merz repeated his demand for the SPD and Greens to "immediately end talks with this radical left-wing party" and begin negotiations with the CDU. He said the formation of a government involving The Left would "without a doubt be a strain on the cooperation here in Berlin", referring to the federal CDU–SPD grand coalition, and that allegations of antisemitism within the party "cannot be waved away with a piece of paper". On the evening of 13 October, the Left parliamentary group constituted itself and after debate included Vanessa Emde, the elected constituency member for Neukölln 1. Emde attracted controversy during and after the election campaign for statements that critics called antisemitic, including implicitly denying Israel's right to exist, advocating for a one-state solution and posing for a photo with Ibrahim Ibrahim at the Neukölln district victory party. Several previous media reports indicated the other two parties had made her exclusion from the group a condition for moving forward; Green leadership later confirmed to Der Spiegel this was the case and that the Left had agreed to it. She had signed the pledge that was agreed to before beginning exploratory talks as with all other elected members. After this, the SPD and Greens temporarily broke off the talks. Krach and Graf released a joint statement that they had taken that action "to determine whether our agreement from last week is still in force. We expect the Left to make clear to us to what extent they take our agreements seriously and intend to implement them."

RBB reported that the text of the pledge signed by Left members was substantially different from that which was agreed to, which contributed to the conflict. However, Eralp announced the next evening that if a coalition agreement were reached it would include the pledge (in its original text) and that the talks, which were described as productive and going well prior to the interruption, would continue. Emde then published a social media video on the evening of 15 October in which she repeated and defended her controversial statements, and said she would not retract them even under threat of expulsion from the parliamentary group. After a crisis meeting, group co-leader Tobias Schulze told RBB "we must admit that we have constituted [our group] with a representative that is not cooperating with the party – neither on the district nor state or federal levels." He continued that "our collective understanding is that the mandate-holder's agreement of The Left has not been accepted [by Emde] and there is no basis for working together." Schulze did not address whether expelling her was a possibility, only saying that further steps are to be decided internally at regular meetings of the group. Krach expressed relief and Graf praised The Left for quickly dealing with the issue.

On 17 October, the three parties jointly announced that they were ready to move on to formal coalition negotiations pending approval from all sides' membership. Included in the report from exploratory talks is a commitment to socializing corporations that own more than 10,000 housing units in the city (an increase from the 3,000 proposed in the 2021 referendum), construction of 100,000 new apartments, putting a complaint to the Federal Constitutional Court seeking to ban the AfD to a vote in the Bundesrat, and measures to combat climate change and reduce the cost of museums and public transport. Evers condemned the report as "a declaration ... of surrender to a radical, partially antisemitic Left Party" and criticized its projected large spending in the face of a difficult budget situation. On 19 October, a convention of Green delegates and the SPD party executive both met to approve moving forward; the SPD vote was 26–3 in favour and for the Greens it was 43–2.

The opening session of the House of Representatives was held on 29 October. As the largest party, The Left had the right to nominate the President of the House and Hendrikje Klein was elected. The CDU and AfD, as the second and third-largest parties, each had the right to nominate one of the two vice-presidents. The CDU's Cornelia Seibeld was elected while the AfD's Martin Trefzer was voted down, leaving the chamber with a single vice-president. Trefzer received 40 yes votes on the secret ballot – 11 more votes than there are members of the AfD bloc – which led to accusations that the extra votes came from CDU members in a fracture of the firewall policy. Emde attended the session, but sat in the rear of the Left ranks and did not appear in its group photo. Shortly before the session began, Left group leadership disclosed that Asya Şenyüz would be temporarily excluded, as she had been unable to attend any of its meetings or sign the mandate-holder's agreement due to a lengthy illness. Şenyüz confirmed she became ill near the start of the campaign and had spent time in the hospital, but hoped to begin regular work by the end of the year.

On 31 October, a special convention of Left members voted with a large majority to begin coalition negotiations. About 50 members, including Emde, protested outside the convention. Negotiations began on 2 November with a goal of finishing before the end of the year. Former mayor and caretaker senator for economics Franziska Giffey of the SPD, who had been asked to lead the working group on that topic, notably declined to participate in view of what she described as unanswered questions about The Left's connections to organized crime and pro-Palestinian activists and "the many promises that have been made [by The Left] that have no basis in the state budget".

On the evening of 6 November, the Left state executive formally demanded that Emde resign her seat. Co-leaders Kerstin Wolter and Maximilian Schirmer said in a statement that "we do not trust her anymore" and "she has publicly questioned [the mandate-holder's agreement] and appeared at a demonstration against our party, instead of fighting for her position as an elected delegate to our convention." This came after Emde caused a further provocation by attending a parliamentary group meeting with a pro-Palestinian activist who was in a party expulsion proceeding for antisemitic statements. Emde released her own statement the following day in which she refused to resign, and at the regular parliamentary group meeting on the 10th its leadership (Eralp and Schultze) announced her expulsion would be put to a vote at the next meeting. They said in a statement it had come to "avoiding further damage to the group's work" and that "there cannot be room for a one-person working group".
