= Senate of Berlin =

Government of Berlin

Flag of the Senate of Berlin

The Senate of Berlin (German: Senat von Berlin; unofficially: Berliner Senat) is the executive body governing the city of Berlin, which at the same time is a state of Germany. According to the Constitution of Berlin the Senate consists of the Governing Mayor of Berlin and up to ten senators appointed by the governing mayor, two of whom are appointed (deputy) mayors. The Senate meets weekly at the Rotes Rathaus (Red Town Hall).

== History ==
The Brandenburg municipalities of Alt-Berlin and Cölln had received town privileges in the 13th century and from 1307 on shared a common administration, but were divided after the elector subjected the city (following the idea of divide and rule) and made it his residential city in 1448. King Frederick I of Prussia by resolution finally had both towns, and three later founded adjacent cities, merged and elevated to the "Royal Capital and Residence City of Berlin" as of 1 January 1710.

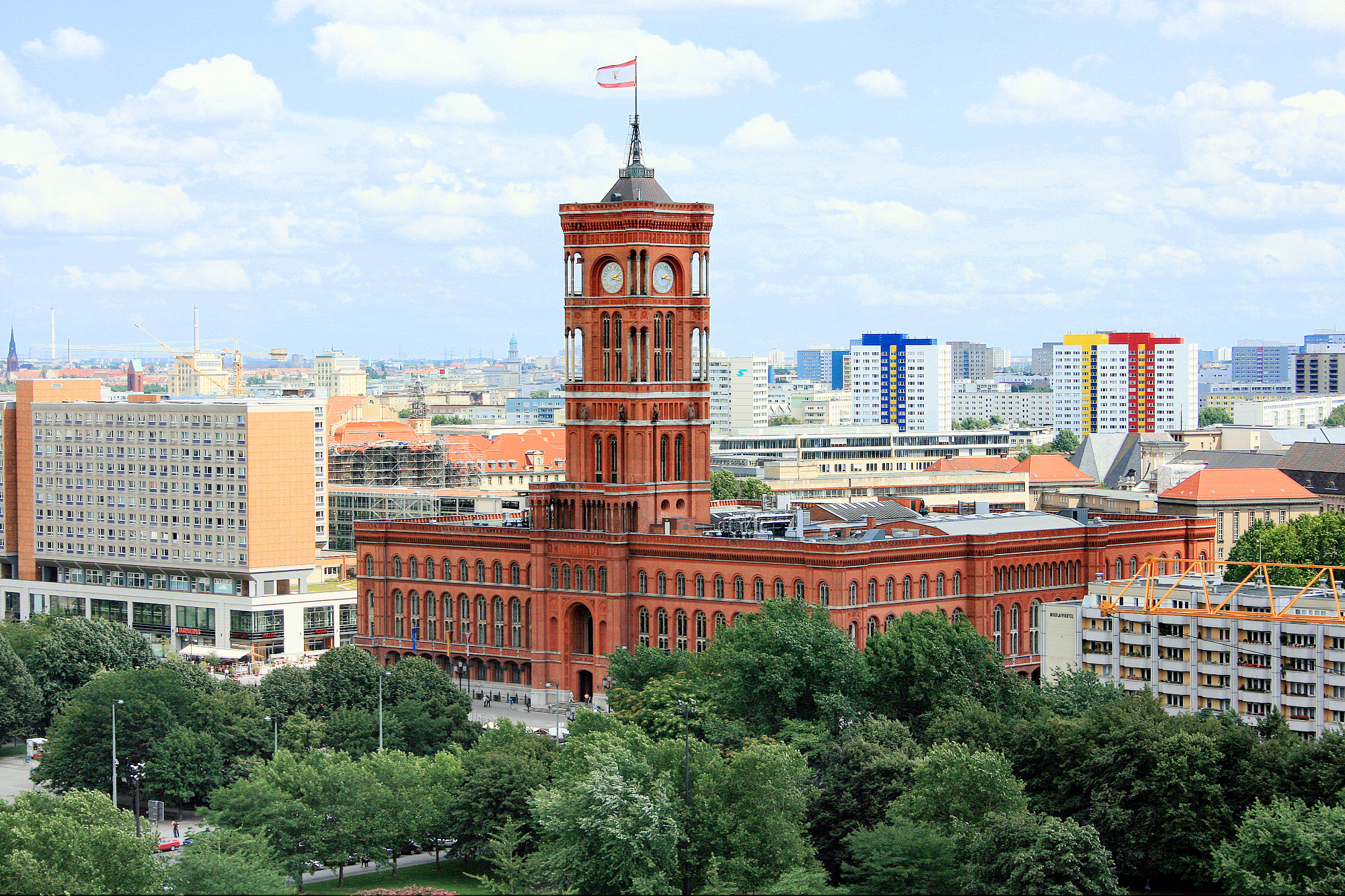
Rotes Rathaus, seat of the Berlin Senate

From the Prussian reforms of 1808 until 1933, Berlin (expanded to Greater Berlin in 1920) was governed by a Magistrat (compulsorily dissolved by Nazi commandeering on 15 March 1933), which was the executive committee of the Stadtverordnetenversammlung (city council; last convened on 27 June 1933) and was represented in each of the boroughs of Berlin by a local office (usually housed in the town hall of a formerly independent suburb). The council was headed by a Lord Mayor, or Oberbürgermeister. Lord Mayor Heinrich Sahm, elected in 1931, remained in office, and joined the NSDAP in November 1933, but resigned in 1935. His power totally depended on Julius Lippert, on 25 March 1933 appointed as Prussian State Commissioner for Berlin. So Berlin was de facto under the ultimate governance of the Nazi regime.

After the defeat of Nazi Germany, Berlin was to be under the ultimate governance of the Allied Kommandatura. However, in the election of 20 October 1946, the city elected an SPD-majority Stadtverordnetenversammlung and an SPD mayor (Otto Ostrowski, resigned 1947). The second elected SPD mayor, the devoted anti-communist Ernst Reuter, was vetoed by the Soviet commander, so Louise Schroeder (SPD) officiated as only acting lord mayor. The Western allies permitted the Berlin SPD to hold a referendum on whether to merge with the Communist party to form a unified single party of the left, the Socialist Unity Party, as realised under pressure in the Soviet occupation zone of Germany, and the members voted against the merger.

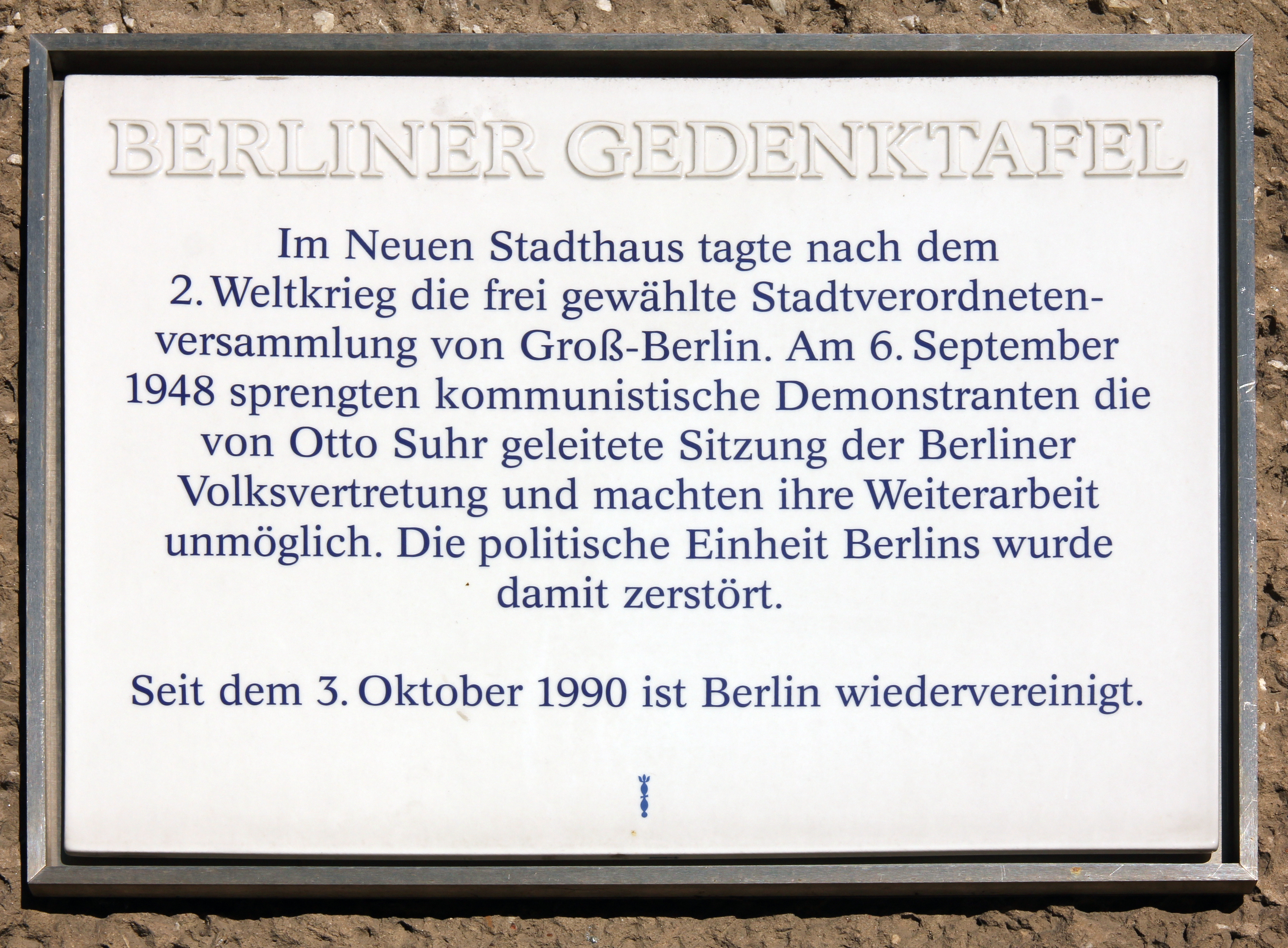
Neues Stadthaus: Plaque commemorating the 1948 Communist putsch

This was unacceptable to the Soviets, who engineered the establishment of an alternative city council in the sector under their direct control. Following the Berlin Blockade, the Soviet sector, which became known as East Berlin (and the capital of the German Democratic Republic as of October 1949) and the three western sectors (British, French, and U.S.) were functionally separated following the attempted Communist putsch in Berlin's city government in September 1948 (a situation formalised in the Four Power Agreement on Berlin of 1971).

Under the new constitution of West Berlin which came into force on 1 September 1950, Berlin was defined as a state of the Federal Republic of Germany; however, due to the Allied veto, its representatives in the federal parliament (and later in the European Parliament) were not directly elected by the citizenry, but appointed by the Berlin parliament (Abgeordnetenhaus) and had no voting power, but a merely advisory vote in those parliaments. On the model of the two Hanseatic city-states within the Federal Republic, Hamburg and Bremen, the Berlin Senate, chosen by the parties represented in the Berlin parliament, was established to perform the functions of a state government, with each of its members heading a department, equivalent to a state ministry, and a Regierender Bürgermeister (Governing or Executive Mayor) at its head and one Bürgermeister as his/her deputy. In the 1950 constitution the maximum number of senators was 16, then each elected by the parliament, but the first Senate had 13.

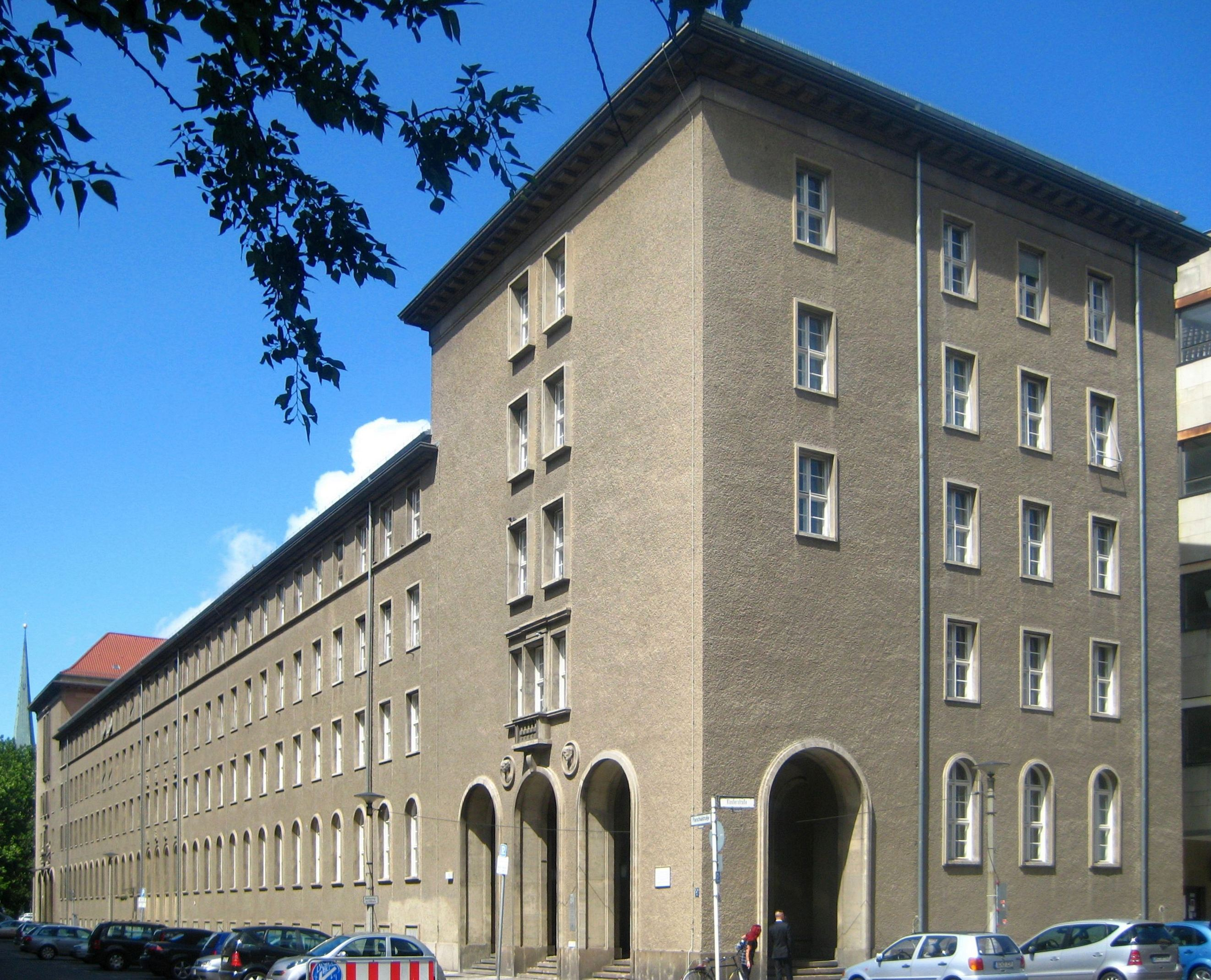
Neues Stadthaus

Thus, following the Hanseatic tradition, the Lord Mayor was only primus inter pares as he and the senators had an elected mandate, therefore the Lord Mayor could not dismiss any senator. Senators could however be removed from their seats by the Parliament. Until 1990 all elected Mayors and Senators had to have their positions confirmed by the Allied commanders of West Berlin. Since both the building then used as the town hall of Berlin, (the Neues Stadthaus), and the Rotes Rathaus (which had been destroyed and was not rebuilt until 1956) were in East Berlin, the Senate met at the former town hall of Schöneberg, Rathaus Schöneberg.

During the transition to a reunified Germany in 1990, a new Magistrat was elected in East Berlin and a Senate appointed in West Berlin, and they jointly governed as a Landesregierung aus Senat und Magistrat (state government of Senate and Magistrat, known popularly as the MagiSenat), which initially met in alternate weeks at the Schöneberg town hall and the Red Town Hall. The Oberbürgermeister (East) and the Regierender Bürgermeister (West) similarly headed the government jointly.

With the completion of reunification on 3 October 1990, the MagiSenat became a unified Berlin Senate, no longer depending on Allied confirmation. The new Senate was reduced to a maximum of 8 members, and senators are now appointed by the Governing Mayor (1995 amendment of the constitution). There are now two Deputy Mayors. The senate meets in the room in the Red Town Hall which was originally created for the Magistrat in the 1950s.

== Departments ==
The Berlin Senate consists of ten ministries or departments (German: Senatsverwaltungen). Their work is coordinated by the staff of the Senate Chancellery, which is under the direction of the governing mayor. As of 2023, the composition of the Senate is as follows:

Portfolio	Senator	Party	Took office	Left office	State secretaries
Governing Mayor of Berlin; Senate Chancellery	Kai Wegner born 15 September 1972 (age 53)	CDU	27 April 2023	Incumbent	Florian Graf (Head of the Senate Chancellery)
Deputy Mayor Senator for Economy, Energy and Enterprise	Franziska Giffey born 3 May 1978 (age 48)	SPD	27 April 2023	Incumbent	Severin Fischer; Michael Biel
Deputy Mayor Senator for Finance	Stefan Evers born 10 October 1979 (age 46)	CDU	27 April 2023	Incumbent	Tanja Mildenberger (Finance); Wolfgang Schyrocki (Personnel)
Senator for Culture and Social Cohesion	Joe Chialo born 18 July 1970 (age 56)	CDU	27 April 2023	Incumbent	Sarah Wedl-Wilson (Culture); Oliver Friederici (Civic Engagement and Democracy)
Senator for Urban Development, Construction and Housing	Christian Gaebler born 8 December 1964 (age 61)	SPD	27 April 2023	Incumbent	Alexander Slotty; Stephan Machulik; Petra Kahlfeldt (Construction Director)
Senator for Interior and Sport	Iris Spranger born 19 September 1961 (age 64)	SPD	27 April 2023	Incumbent	Christian Hochgrebe (Interior); Franziska Becker (Sport)
Senator for Education, Youth and Family	Katharina Günther-Wünsch born 3 April 1983 (age 43)	CDU	27 April 2023	Incumbent	Falko Liecke (Youth); Torsten Kühne (School Construction); Christina Henke (Interior School Affairs)
Senator for Science, Health and Care	Ina Czyborra born 23 June 1966 (age 60)	SPD	27 April 2023	Incumbent	Ellen Haußdörfer (Health); Henry Marx (Science)
Senator for Labour, Social Affairs, Equality, Integration, Diversity and Anti-Discrimination	Cansel Kiziltepe born 8 October 1975 (age 50)	SPD	27 April 2023	Incumbent	Aziz Bozkurt (Social Affairs); Max Landero (Integration and Anti-Discrimination); Micha Klapp (Labour and Equality)
Senator for Mobility, Transport, Climate Protection and Environment	Manja Schreiner born 29 April 1978 (age 48)	CDU	27 April 2023	Incumbent	Britta Behrendt (Environment); Claudia Stutz (Transport)
Senator for Justice and Consumer Protection	Felor Badenberg born 21 May 1975 (age 51)	Ind. (CDU nomination)	27 April 2023	Incumbent	Dirk Feuerberg (Justice); Esther Uleer (Consumer Protection)
