= Wegner senate =

State government of Berlin

Senate of Kai Wegner Senate Wegner
- 29th Senate of Berlin
- 27 April 2023 –
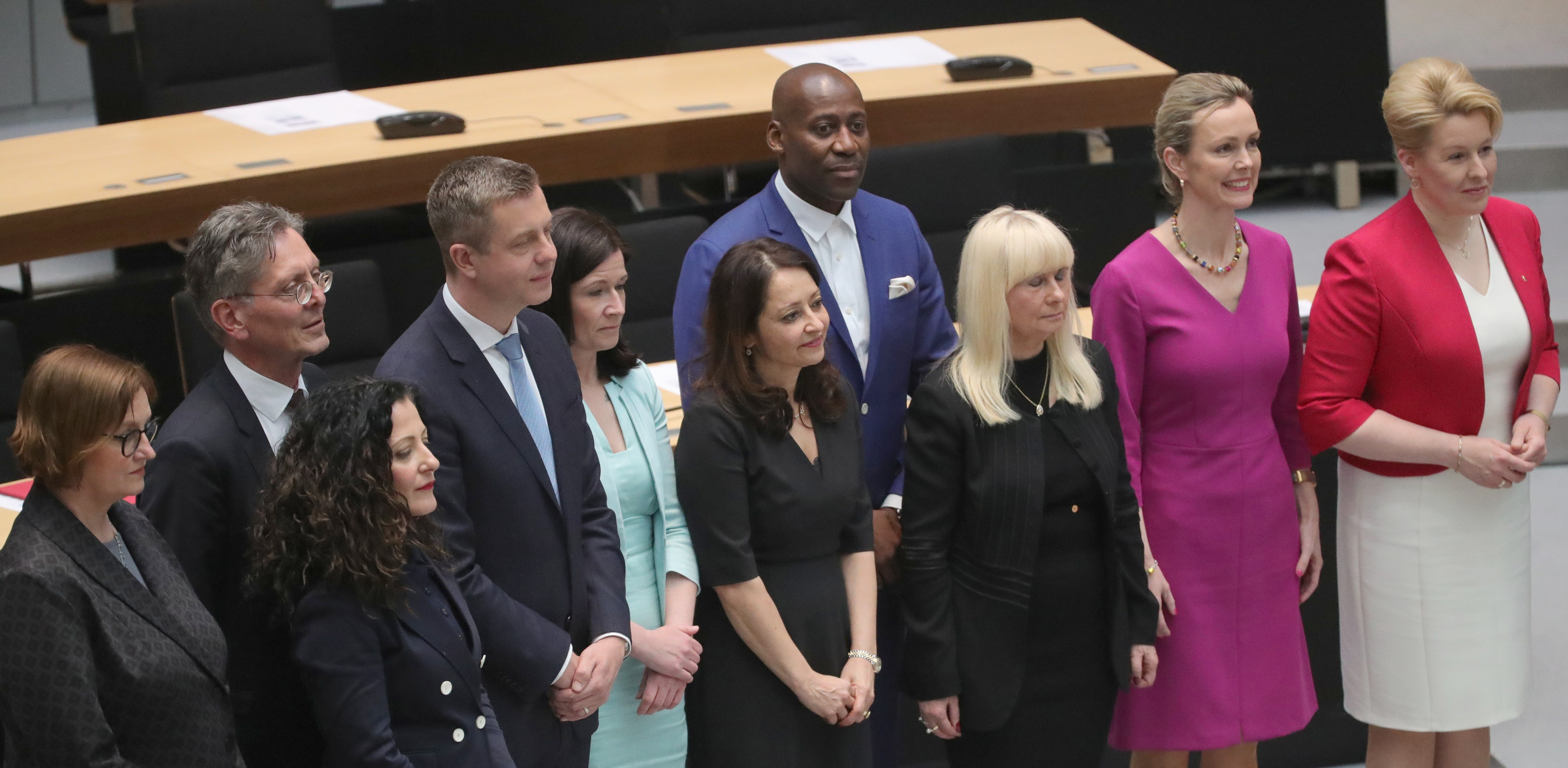
- The members of the Wegner senate at the Abgeordnetenhaus plenary session on 27 April 2023 From left to right: Ina Czyborra, Christian Gaebler, Cansel Kiziltepe, Stefan Evers, Katharina Günther-Wünsch, Felor Badenberg, Joe Chialo, Iris Spranger, Manja Schreiner, Franziska Giffey
- Date formed: 27 April 2023

People and organisations
- Governing Mayor: Kai Wegner
- Deputy Mayor: Franziska Giffey; Stefan Evers
- No. of ministers: 10
- Member parties: Christian Democratic Union; Social Democratic Party
- Status in legislature: Coalition government (Majority)
- Opposition parties: Alliance 90/The Greens; The Left; Alternative for Germany; Sahra Wagenknecht Alliance (from 2024)

History
- Election: 2023 Berlin repeat state election
- Legislature term: 19th Abgeordnetenhaus of Berlin
- Predecessor: Giffey senate
- Successor: Eralp senate

The Wegner senate is the current state government of Berlin, sworn in on 27 April 2023 after Kai Wegner was elected as Governing Mayor of Berlin by the members of the Abgeordnetenhaus of Berlin. It is the 29th Senate of Berlin.

It was formed after the 2023 Berlin repeat state election by the Christian Democratic Union (CDU) and Social Democratic Party (SPD). Excluding the Governing Mayor, the senate comprises ten ministers, called Senators. Five are members of the SPD, four are members of the CDU, and one is an independent politician (nominated by the CDU).

== Formation ==
The previous Senate was a coalition government of the SPD, Left, and Greens led by Governing Mayor Franziska Giffey of the SPD.

The election took place on 12 February 2023, and resulted in a clear victory for the opposition CDU, moved from third to first place with 28% of the vote on a swing of ten percentage points. The SPD declined to 18.5% and finished just 53 votes ahead of the Greens. The Left recorded a small decline and the Alternative for Germany (AfD) a small improvement.

Overall, the outgoing coalition retained a reduced majority. After talks with several parties, on 1 March the SPD vote 25 to 12 to seek negotiations with the CDU for a grand coalition. Negotiations began on 13 March and concluded on 3 April, with the two parties presenting a 135-page agreement. It was subsequently submitted for approval by the SPD membership. The results of the vote were announced on 23 April, with 54.3% voting in favour on a turnout of 64%.

The Abgeordnetenhaus elected Wegner as Governing Mayor on 27 April. He failed to win the first two ballots and was elected on the third, winning won 86 votes out of 159 cast, with 70 against, and three abstentions.

Governing Mayor election Kai Wegner (CDU)
Ballot →	27 April 2023		
Required majority →	80 out of 159	80 out of 159	Simple majority
For	71 / 159	79 / 159	86 / 159
Against	86 / 159	79 / 159	70 / 159
Abstentions	1 / 159	1 / 159	3 / 159
Invalid	1 / 159	0 / 159	0 / 159

== Policy ==
In May 2023, the Wegner government created the role of Queer Berlin Liaison Officer.

== Composition ==
Portfolio	Senator	Party	Took office	Left office	State secretaries
Governing Mayor of Berlin; Senate Chancellery	Kai Wegner born 15 September 1972 (age 54)	CDU	27 April 2023	Incumbent	Florian Graf (Head of the Senate Chancellery); Florian Hauer (Federal and European Affairs); Martina Klement (Chief Digital Officer) (Until 18 March 2026); Matthias Hundt (Chief Digital Officer) (Since 18 March 2026)
Deputy Mayor Senator for Economy, Energy and Enterprise	Franziska Giffey born 3 May 1978 (age 48)	SPD	27 April 2023	Incumbent	Severin Fischer; Michael Biel
Deputy Mayor Senator for Finance	Stefan Evers born 10 October 1979 (age 47)	CDU	27 April 2023	Incumbent	Tanja Mildenberger (Finance); Wolfgang Schyrocki (Personnel)
Senator for Culture and Social Cohesion	Stefan Evers born 10 October 1979 (age 47)	CDU	29 April 2026	Incumbent	Cerstin Richter-Kotowski (Culture); Alexander Straßmeir (Civic Engagement and Democracy)
Acting Senator for Mobility, Transport, Climate Protection and Environment	Stefan Evers born 10 October 1979 (age 47)	CDU	30 April 2024	23 May 2024	Britta Behrendt (Environment); Claudia Stutz (Transport)
Senator for Urban Development, Construction and Housing	Christian Gaebler born 8 December 1964 (age 61)	SPD	27 April 2023	Incumbent	Alexander Slotty; Stephan Machulik; Petra Kahlfeldt (Construction Director)
Senator for Interior and Sport	Iris Spranger born 19 September 1961 (age 65)	SPD	27 April 2023	Incumbent	Christian Hochgrebe (Interior); Nicola Böcker-Giannini (Sport) (Until 17 October 2023); Franziska Becker (Sport) (Since 17 October 2023)
Senator for Education, Youth and Family	Katharina Günther-Wünsch born 3 April 1983 (age 43)	CDU	27 April 2023	Incumbent	Falko Liecke (Youth); Torsten Kühne (School Construction); Christina Henke (Interior School Affairs)
Senator for Science, Health and Care	Ina Czyborra born 23 June 1966 (age 60)	SPD	27 April 2023	Incumbent	Ellen Haußdörfer (Health); Henry Marx (Science)
Senator for Labour, Social Affairs, Equality, Integration, Diversity and Anti-Discrimination	Cansel Kiziltepe born 8 October 1975 (age 51)	SPD	27 April 2023	Incumbent	Aziz Bozkurt (Social Affairs); Max Landero (Integration and Anti-Discrimination); Micha Klapp (Labour and Equality)
Senator for Mobility, Transport, Climate Protection and Environment	Ute Bonde born 29 April 1978 (age 48)	CDU	23 May 2024	incumbent	Britta Behrendt (Environment) (Until 31 August 2025); Andreas Kraus (Environment) (Since 1 September 2025); Claudia Stutz (Transport) (Until 27 May 2024); Johannes Wieczorek (Transport) (5 June 2024 - 31 May 2025); Arne Herz (Transport) (Since 3 June 2025)
Senator for Mobility, Transport, Climate Protection and Environment	Manja Schreiner born 29 April 1978 (age 48)	CDU	27 April 2023	30 April 2024	Britta Behrendt (Environment); Claudia Stutz (Transport)
Senator for Justice and Consumer Protection	Felor Badenberg born 21 May 1975 (age 51)	CDU (Previously Independent)	27 April 2023	Incumbent	Dirk Feuerberg (Justice); Esther Uleer (Consumer Protection) (Until 4 June 2025); Susanne Hoffmann (Consumer Protection) (Since 1 July 2025)
Senator for Culture and Social Cohesion	Sarah Wedl-Wilson born 31 August 1969 (age 57)	Ind. (CDU nomination)	22 May 2025	24 April 2026	Sarah Wedl-Wilson (Culture) (Until 22 May 2025); Cerstin Richter-Kotowski (Culture) (Since 11 June 2025); Oliver Friederici (Civic Engagement and Democracy) (Until 21 April 2026); Alexander Straßmeir (Civic Engagement and Democracy) (Since 21 April 2026)
Senator for Culture and Social Cohesion	Joe Chialo born 18 July 1970 (age 56)	CDU	27 April 2023	2 May 2025	Sarah Wedl-Wilson (Culture) (Until 22 May 2025); Cerstin Richter-Kotowski (Culture) (Since 11 June 2025); Oliver Friederici (Civic Engagement and Democracy) (Until 21 April 2026); Alexander Straßmeir (Civic Engagement and Democracy) (Since 21 April 2026)
