= Cansel Kiziltepe =

German politician

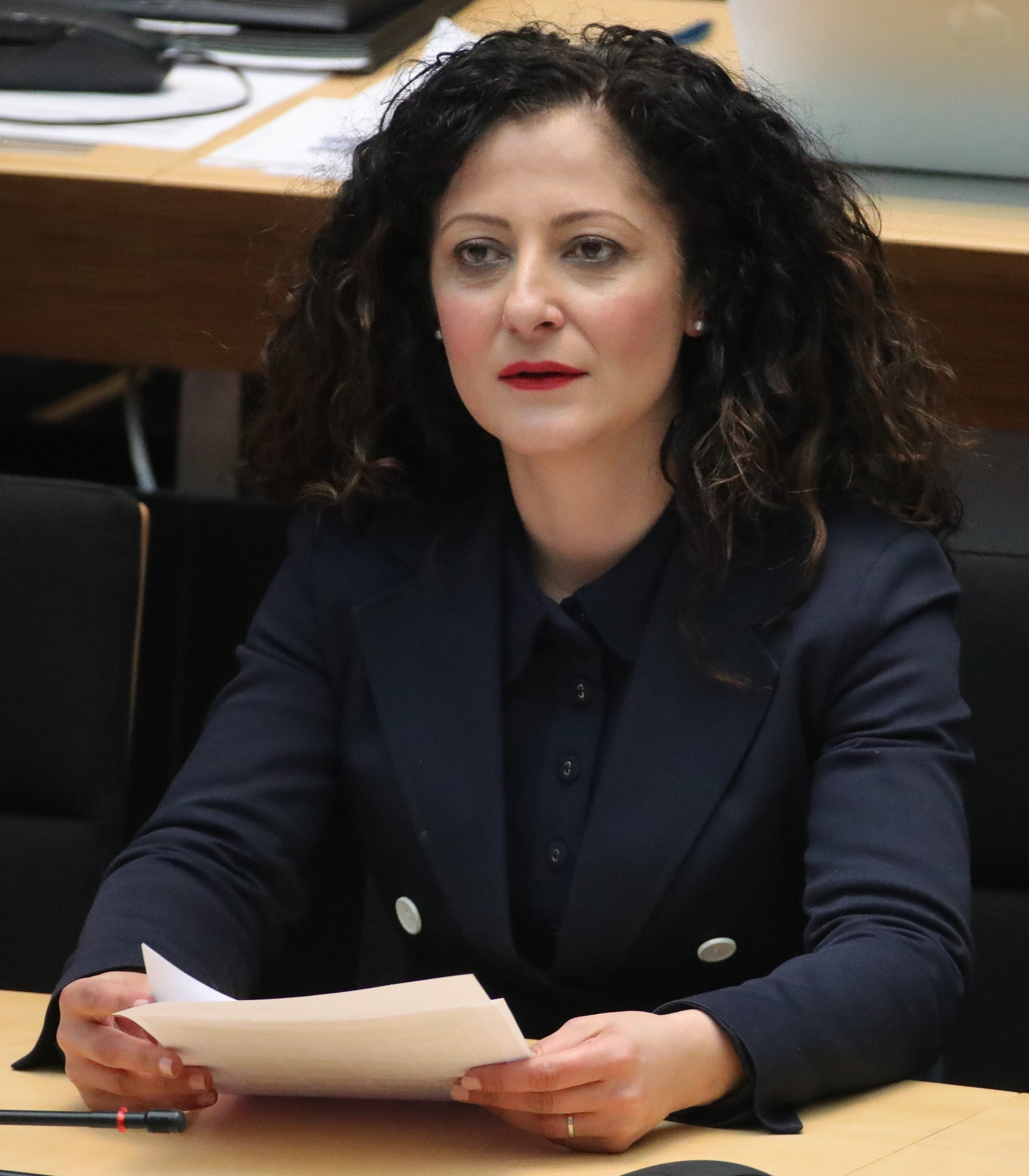
- Kiziltepe in 2023

Senator for Labour, Social Affairs, Equality, Integration, Diversity and Anti-Discrimination
- Incumbent
- Assumed office 27 April 2023
- Governing Mayor: Kai Wegner
- Preceded by: Katja Kipping

Member of the Bundestag
- In office 2013–2023
- Succeeded by: Ana-Maria Trăsnea

Personal details
- Born: 8 October 1975 (age 51) Berlin, West Germany (now Germany)
- Party: SPD
- Education: Technische Universität Berlin

Cansel Kiziltepe (born 8 October 1975) is a German economist and politician of the Social Democratic Party (SPD) who has been serving as State Minister (Senator) for Labour, Social Affairs, Equality, Integration, Diversity and Anti-Discrimination in the government of Governing Mayor Kai Wegner since 2023.

Prior to joining the state government, Kiziltepe was a member of the Bundestag from the state of Berlin from 2013 to 2023. In addition to her parliamentary work, she served as Parliamentary State Secretary in the Federal Ministry for Housing, Urban Development and Building in the coalition government of Chancellor Olaf Scholz from 2021 to 2023.

== Early life and career ==
Of ethnic Turkish origin, Kiziltepe studied economics at Technische Universität Berlin. From 2005 until 2012, she worked as legislative advisor to Ottmar Schreiner. She subsequently worked as economist on the staff of board member Horst Neumann at Volkswagen from 2012 until 2013.

== Political career ==
=== Member of the German Parliament, 2013–2023 ===
Kiziltepe became a member of the Bundestag in the 2013 German federal election. From 2013 to 2021, she was a member of the Finance Committee; in this capacity, she served as her parliamentary group's rapporteur on plans to introduce a financial transaction tax. In 2018, she also joined the Sports Committee.

Within the SPD parliamentary group, Kiziltepe belonged to the Parliamentary Left, a left-wing movement.

In the negotiations to form a so-called traffic light coalition of the SPD, the Green Party and the Free Democratic Party (FDP) following the 2021 federal elections, Kiziltepe was part of her party's delegation in the working group on financial regulation and the national budget, co-chaired by Doris Ahnen, Lisa Paus and Christian Dürr.

=== Career in state politics ===
Following the 2023 Berlin state election, Kiziltepe was appointed State Minister (Senator) for Labour, Social Affairs, Equality, Integration, Diversity and Anti-Discrimination in the government of Governing Mayor Kai Wegner. As one of the state's representatives at the Bundesrat since 2023, she has been serving on the Committee on Family and Senior Citizen Affairs, the Committee on Labour, Integration and Social Policy, and the Committee on Women and Youth.

In the negotiations to form a Grand Coalition under the leadership of Friedrich Merz's Christian Democrats (CDU together with the Bavarian CSU) and the SPD following the 2025 German elections, Kiziltepe was part of the SPD delegation in the working group on labour and social affairs, led by Carsten Linnemann, Stephan Stracke and Katja Mast.

In the negotiations to form a coalition government in Berlin under the prospective leadership of Elif Eralp following the 2026 state elections, Kiziltepe co-led her party's delegation in the working group on labour and social affairs together with Lars Düsterhöft.

== Other activities ==
- German Federal Environmental Foundation (DBU), Member of the Board of Trustees (since 2022)
- Business Forum of the Social Democratic Party of Germany, Member of the Advisory Board on Economic Policy (since 2020)
- Nuclear Waste Disposal Fund (KENFO), Member of the Board of Trustees (2018–2022)
- IG Metall, Member
