= Marzahn-Hellersdorf 5 =

State electoral district of Germany

- Electoral district for the Berlin House of Representatives
- Marzahn-Hellersdorf 5 in 2026
- District: Marzahn-Hellersdorf
- Electorate: 34,280 (2026)

Current electoral district
- Party: CDU
- Member: Katharina Günther-Wünsch

Marzahn-Hellersdorf 5 is an electoral constituency (German: Wahlkreis) represented in the House of Representatives of Berlin. It elects one member via first-past-the-post voting.

== Geography ==
The constituency comprises the areas of Kaulsdorf South, Mahlsdorf North, and Mahlsdorf South. It is entirely within the borough of Marzahn-Hellersdorf.

There were 34,280 eligible voters in 2026.

== Members ==
Election	Member	Party	%
1999	Mario Czaja	CDU	37.4
2001	Gregor Gysi	PDS	51.0
2006	Mario Czaja	CDU	33.8
2011	Mario Czaja	CDU	41.5
2016	Mario Czaja	CDU	47.2
2021	Katharina Günther-Wünsch	CDU	33.7
2023	Katharina Günther-Wünsch	CDU	45.0
2026	Katharina Günther-Wünsch	CDU	31.6

== Election results ==
=== 2026 election ===
State election (2026): Marzahn-Hellersdorf 5
Notes:	Blue background denotes the winner of the electorate vote. Pink background denotes a candidate elected from their party list. Yellow background denotes an electorate win by a list member, or other incumbent. A ✓ or ✗ denotes status of any incumbent, win or lose respectively.						
Party	Candidate	Votes	%	±%	Party votes	%	±%
CDU	✓ Katharina Günther-Wünsch	8,890	31.6	▼13.5	7,273	25.6	▼14.5
AfD	Thomas Harder	6,971	24.7	▲12.1	7,390	26.0	▲12.7
Left	Juliane Witt	4,651	16.5	▲4.9	4,658	16.4	▲4.8
SPD	Luise Lehmann	2,722	9.7	▼5.7	2,568	9.0	▼7.2
Greens	Manuela Neubert	1,888	6.7	▼0.4	2,221	7.8	▲0.3
BSW	Ina Seidel-Grothe	1,744	6.2		2,005	7.0	
FDP	Peter Langer	751	2.7	▼0.5	832	2.9	▼1.1
Tierschutzpartei					613	2.2	▼0.1
Volt	Stefan Kuhn	560	2.0		491	1.7	▲1.2
PARTEI					178	0.6	▼0.4
PdF					112	0.4	
ÖDP					42	0.1	▲0.1
DKP					31	0.1	▼0.1
du.					22	0.1	Steady
SGP					4	0.0	Steady
Informal votes		556			293		
Total valid votes		28,177			28,440		
Turnout		28,733	83.8	▲7.7			
CDU hold	Majority	1,919	6.9	▼22.7			

=== 2023 repeat election ===
Changes denoted below for the 2023 election are compared to the 2016 election, as the 2021 election was declared invalid.

State election (2023): Marzahn-Hellersdorf 5
Notes:	Blue background denotes the winner of the electorate vote. Pink background denotes a candidate elected from their party list. Yellow background denotes an electorate win by a list member, or other incumbent. A ✓ or ✗ denotes status of any incumbent, win or lose respectively.						
Party	Candidate	Votes	%	±%	Party votes	%	±%
CDU	Katharina Günther-Wünsch	11,446	45.0	▼2.2	10,196	40.1	▲8.4
SPD	Luise Lehmann	3,909	15.4	▲2.9	4,123	16.2	▲0.3
AfD	Vadim Derksen	3,212	12.6	▼3.1	3,377	13.3	▼5.5
Left	Stefanie Wagner-Boysen	2,952	11.6	▼4.7	2,934	11.5	▼5.9
Greens	Stefan Ziller	1,814	7.1	▲2.3	1,904	7.5	▲1.8
FDP	Justyna Anna Grecko	797	3.1	▲0.5	1,029	4.0	▲0.4
Tierschutzpartei	Jakob Berlin	742	2.9		566	2.2	▲0.8
PARTEI	Martin Walter	354	1.4		264	1.0	▲0.1
Gray Panthers					136	0.5	▼0.5
Volt					135	0.5	
The Grays					122	0.5	
dieBasis	Steffi Möller	190	0.7		119	0.5	
Verjüngungsforschung					88	0.3	▼0.1
DKP					52	0.2	Steady
Team Todenhöfer					52	0.2	
Humanists					50	0.2	
FW					49	0.2	
Pirates					44	0.2	▼0.8
Bildet Berlin!					33	0.1	
NPD					33	0.1	▼0.4
Mieterpartei					31	0.1	
Klimaliste					27	0.1	
du.					16	0.1	
ÖDP					16	0.1	
The Pinks/Alliance 21					15	0.1	
BüSo					13	0.1	Steady
SGP					12	0.0	Steady
Bergpartei, die ÜberPartei					9	0.0	
LKR					5	0.0	▼0.7
Informal votes		158			139		
Total valid votes		25,216			25,450		
Turnout		25,614	76.1	▼2.3			
CDU hold	Majority	7,537	29.6				

=== 2021 election (annulled) ===
The election in 2021 was annulled and rerun in 2023.

State election (2021): Marzahn-Hellersdorf 5
Notes:	Blue background denotes the winner of the electorate vote. Pink background denotes a candidate elected from their party list. Yellow background denotes an electorate win by a list member, or other incumbent. A ✓ or ✗ denotes status of any incumbent, win or lose respectively.						
Party	Candidate	Votes	%	±%	Party votes	%	±%
CDU	Katharina Günther-Wünsch	9,461	33.5	▼13.7	8,229	29.0	▼2.7
SPD	Luise Lehmann	5,210	18.5	▲6.0	5,340	18.8	▲2.9
Left	Stefanie Wagner-Boysen	4,041	14.3	▼2.0	4,188	14.7	▼2.7
AfD	Vadim Derksen	3,283	11.6	▼4.1	3,354	11.8	▼6.9
Greens	Stefan Ziller	2,542	9.0	▲4.2	2,537	8.9	▲3.3
FDP	Justyna Anna Grecko	1,669	5.9	▲3.3	1,830	6.4	▲2.8
Tierschutzpartei	Jakob Berlin	1,032	3.7		637	2.2	▲0.8
PARTEI	Martin Walter	504	1.8		375	1.3	▲0.3
dieBasis	Steffi Möller	474	1.7		316	1.1	
The Grays					246	0.9	
FW					225	0.8	
Volt					183	0.6	
Gray Panthers					173	0.6	▼0.4
APT					157	0.6	
Verjüngungsforschung					108	0.4	▼0.1
Team Todenhöfer					94	0.3	
Pirates					74	0.3	▼0.7
Bildet Berlin!					57	0.2	
NPD					44	0.2	▼0.4
DKP					40	0.1	▼0.1
Humanists					36	0.1	
Mieterpartei					27	0.1	
du.					25	0.1	
Klimaliste					24	0.1	
LKR					24	0.1	▼0.7
ÖDP					22	0.1	
The Pinks/Alliance 21					18	0.1	
BüSo					12	0.0	Steady
Bergpartei, die ÜberPartei					9	0.0	
SGP					7	0.0	▼0.1
Informal votes		317			237		
Total valid votes		28,216			28,411		
Turnout		28,677	85.3	▲6.9			
CDU hold	Majority	4,251	15.0				

== See also ==
- Politics of Berlin
- House of Representatives of Berlin
