= Stefan Evers =

German politician

Stefan Evers MdA MdBR
- Evers in 2023

Deputy Governing Mayor of Berlin
- Incumbent
- Assumed office 27 April 2023 Serving with Franziska Giffey
- Governing Mayor: Kai Wegner
- Preceded by: Klaus Lederer

Senator for Finance of Berlin
- Incumbent
- Assumed office 27 April 2023
- Governing Mayor: Kai Wegner
- Preceded by: Daniel Wesener

Senator for Culture and Social Cohesion of Berlin
- Incumbent
- Assumed office 29 April 2026
- Governing Mayor: Kai Wegner
- Preceded by: Sarah Wedl-Wilson

Leader of the Christian Democratic Union in Berlin
- Acting
- Assumed office 13 July 2026
- Deputy: Manuela Anders-Granitzki; Nadja Zivkovic; Adrian Grasse
- Preceded by: Kai Wegner
Parliamentary positions
Leader of the CDU in the Abgeordnetenhaus of Berlin
Incumbent
Assumed office 24 September 2026
Preceded by	Dirk Stettner
Member of the Abgeordnetenhaus of Berlin
Incumbent
Assumed office 18 September 2011
Constituency	Christian Democratic Union List

Personal details
- Born: 10 October 1979 (age 47) Paderborn, Germany
- Party: Christian Democratic Union (since 1998)
- Education: University of Potsdam

Stefan Evers (born 10 October 1979) is a German politician of the Christian Democratic Union (CDU) who has been serving as Deputy Governing Mayor of Berlin and Senator for Finance since 2023, as well as Senator for Culture and Social Cohesion since 2026. He has been a member of the Berlin House of Representatives since 2011.

Following the decision of Kai Wegner not to seek re-election as Governing Mayor in July 2026, he became acting leader of the CDU in Berlin and the party's lead candidate for the 2026 Berlin state election. Following the election, he was elected leader of the CDU parliamentary group.

Despite not winning the election, Evers could still become Governing Mayor of Berlin. This is because the Governing Mayor is elected by the House of Representatives and a Black–red–green coalition remains arithmetically possible.

== Early life and career ==
Evers grew up in Paderborn and has been living in Berlin since 1999. He studied law at the University of Potsdam. During his studies, he worked as an assistant to the members of the German Bundestag, Friedhelm Ost and Werner Kuhn. After passing his state examination, he became the managing director of a strategy and communication consultancy.

== Political career ==
=== Career in state politics ===
In the 2011 state elections, Evers was first elected for the CDU (Christian Democratic Union) to the Berlin House of Representatives and served there until 2018, initially as the deputy leader of his party's parliamentary group.

Following the lost House of Representatives election in 2016, Evers was elected as the Secretary General of the CDU Berlin on the recommendation of chairwoman Monika Grütters. He retained this position after Kai Wegner was elected to succeed Grütters as chairman in 2018.

From 2018 to 2023, Evers served as the parliamentary manager of the CDU's group in the State Parliament. Additionally, he was the group's spokesperson for urban development policies from 2011 to 2023 and served as chairman in the investigative committees 'BER I' (2012 to 2016) and 'DIESE eG' (2021). Most recently, Evers was directly elected to the Berlin House of Representatives in the Treptow-Köpenick 3 constituency (Altglienicke-Adlershof) during the Berlin repeat election on February 12, 2023.

Until 2021, Evers co-chaired the CDU's national working group on 'Equivalent Living Conditions in Urban and Rural Areas', alongside Christina Schulze Föcking.

Most recently, in June 2021, Evers was confirmed as Secretary General with a record result of 92.5 percent. In this capacity, he was also responsible for the highly regarded campaign of the Berlin CDU for the Berlin repeat election in 2023, an outcome that was described by the media as a 'landslide victory' and awarded the 'Politikaward' as the 'Best Election Campaign of the Year.' At the state party conference in September 2023, he resigned from the position of Secretary General and was elected as the deputy chairman of the CDU Berlin by a large majority.

=== Senator for Finance, 2023–present ===
Since April 27, 2023, Evers has been the mayor of the city of Berlin and the senator for finance in the Wegner senate. As one of the state’s representatives at the Bundesrat since 2023, he has been serving on the Finance Committee.

== Other activities ==
- KfW, Member of the Board of Supervisory Directors (since 2024)
- Charité, Ex-Officio Member of the Supervisory Board (since 2023)

== Personal life ==
Evers is gay. Since 2015, he has been married to a banker.
