= Felor Badenberg =

German politician (born 1975)

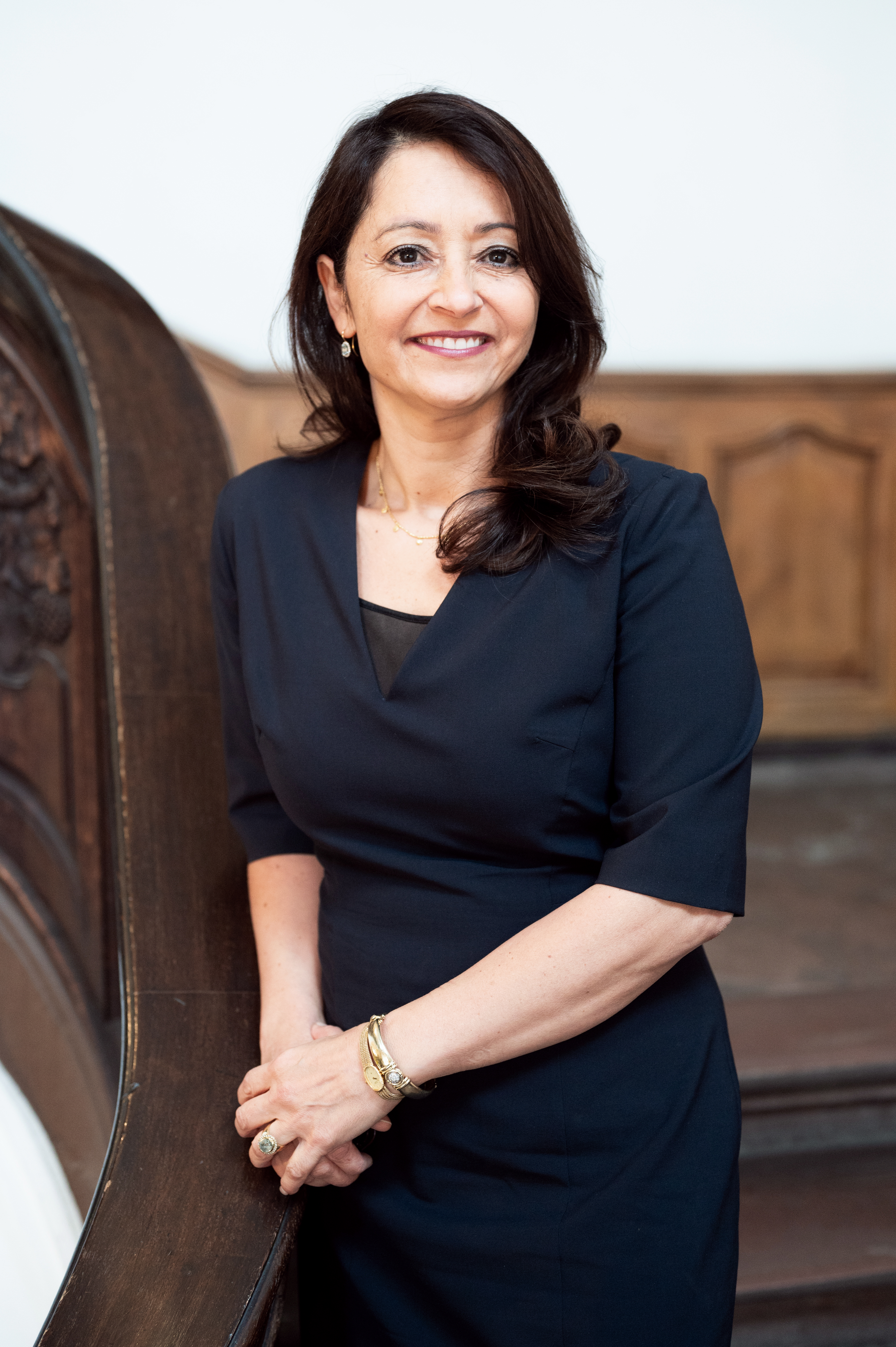
- Badenberg in 2023

Senator for Justice and Consumer Protection of Berlin
- Incumbent
- Assumed office 27 April 2023
- Mayor: Kai Wegner
- Preceded by: Lena Kreck

Personal details
- Born: 1 May 1975 (age 50)
- Party: Christian Democratic Union (since 2024)

Felor Badenberg (née Haghighi-Niat; born 1 May 1975) is an Iranian-born German politician serving as senator for justice and consumer protection of Berlin since 2023. From 2022 to 2023, she served as vice president of the Federal Office for the Protection of the Constitution.
