= Ina Czyborra =

German politician (born 1966)

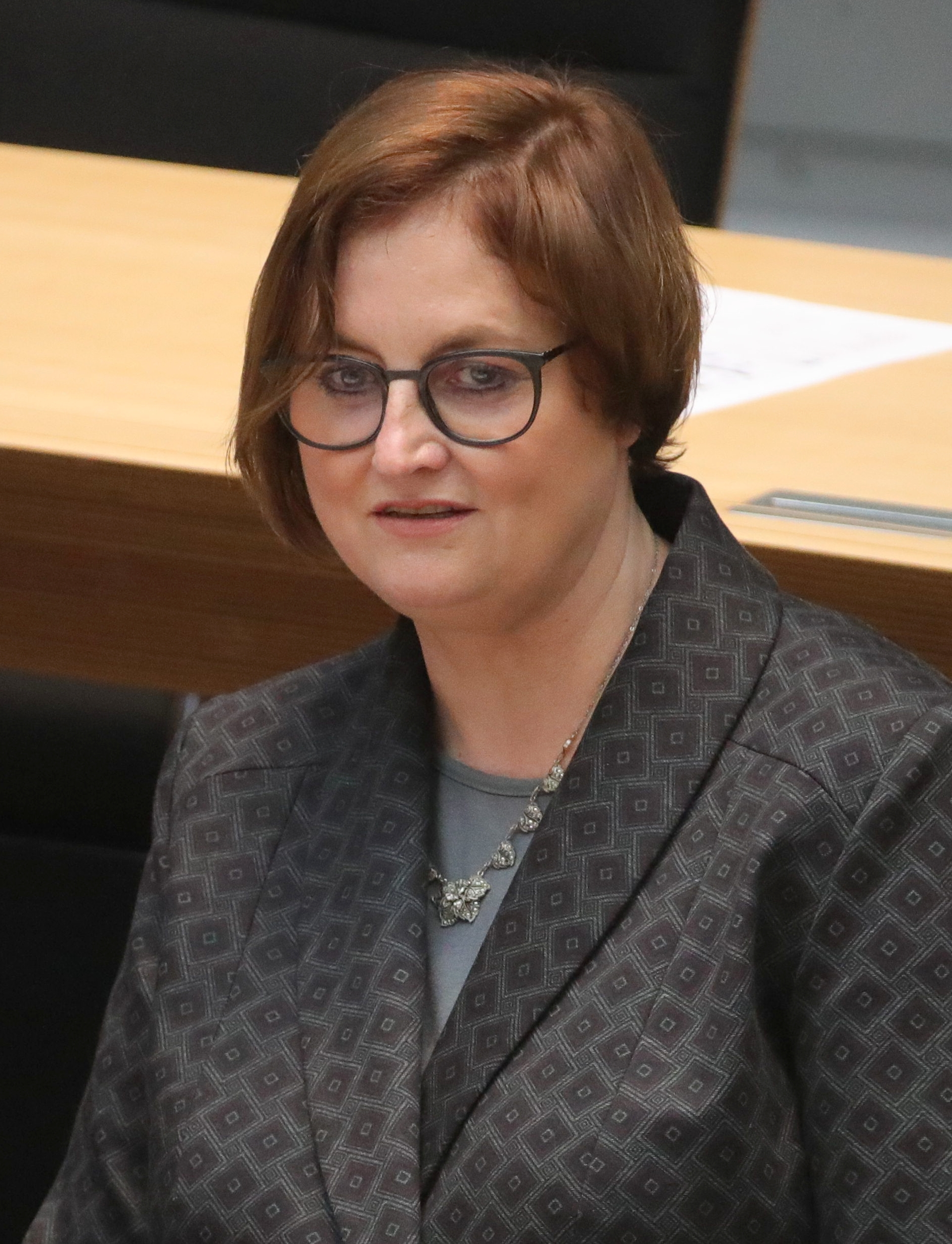
- Czyborra in 2023

Senator for Science, Health and Care of Berlin
- Incumbent
- Assumed office 27 April 2023
- Mayor: Kai Wegner
- Preceded by: Ulrike Gote

Personal details
- Born: 23 June 1966 (age 59)
- Party: Social Democratic Party

Ina Maria Czyborra (born 23 June 1966) is a German politician serving as senator for science, health and care of Berlin since 2023. She has been a member of the Berlin House of Representatives since 2011.
