= Asya Şenyüz =

German politician (born 2004)

Member of the Berlin House of Representatives
- Incumbent
- Assumed office 29 October 2026
- Constituency: Tempelhof-Schöneberg

Personal details
- Born: 2004 (age 21–22)
- Party: Die Linke

Asya Şenyüz (born 2004) is a German politician who was elected member of the Berlin House of Representatives in 2026. She is the press and public relations officer of Die Linke in Mitte.
