= Tamara Mazzi =

German politician, educator, social activist

Member of the Bundestag from Schleswig-Holstein
- Incumbent
- Assumed office 2025

Personal details
- Born: 13 January 1992 (age 34) Kiel
- Party: Die Linke

Tamara Ursula Katharina Mazzi (born 13 January 1992) is a German politician from Die Linke. She was elected to the German Bundestag in the 2025 German federal election via the state list. She is a teacher from Kiel.
