= Martin Trefzer =

German politician (born 1969)

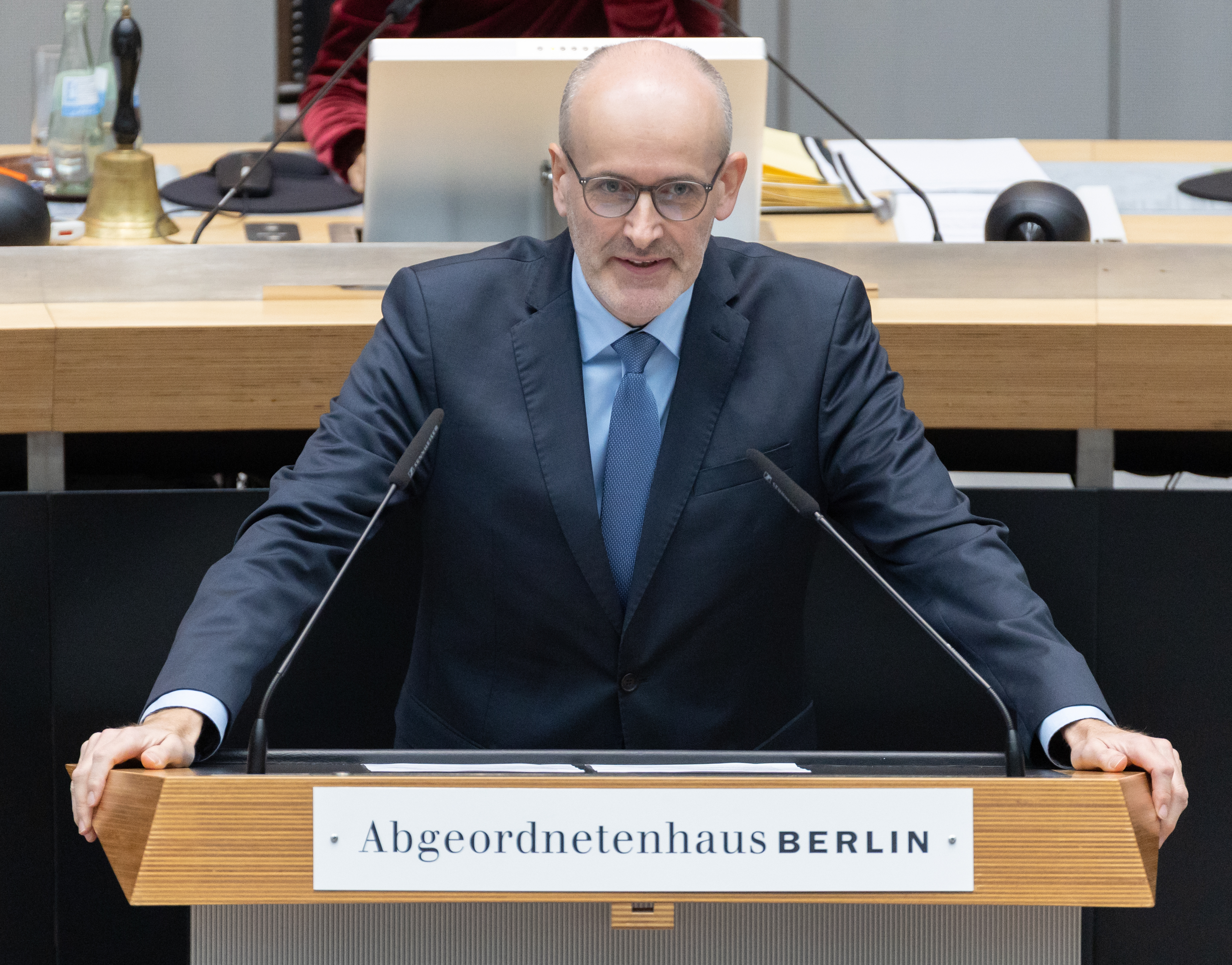
- Trefzer in 2025

Member of the Berlin House of Representatives
- Incumbent
- Assumed office 27 October 2016

Personal details
- Born: 15 September 1969 (age 56)
- Party: Alternative for Germany (since 2013)

Martin Trefzer (born 15 September 1969) is a German politician serving as a member of the Berlin House of Representatives since 2016. He has served as spokesperson of the Alternative for Germany in Treptow-Köpenick since 2015.
