= Christian Gaebler =

German politician

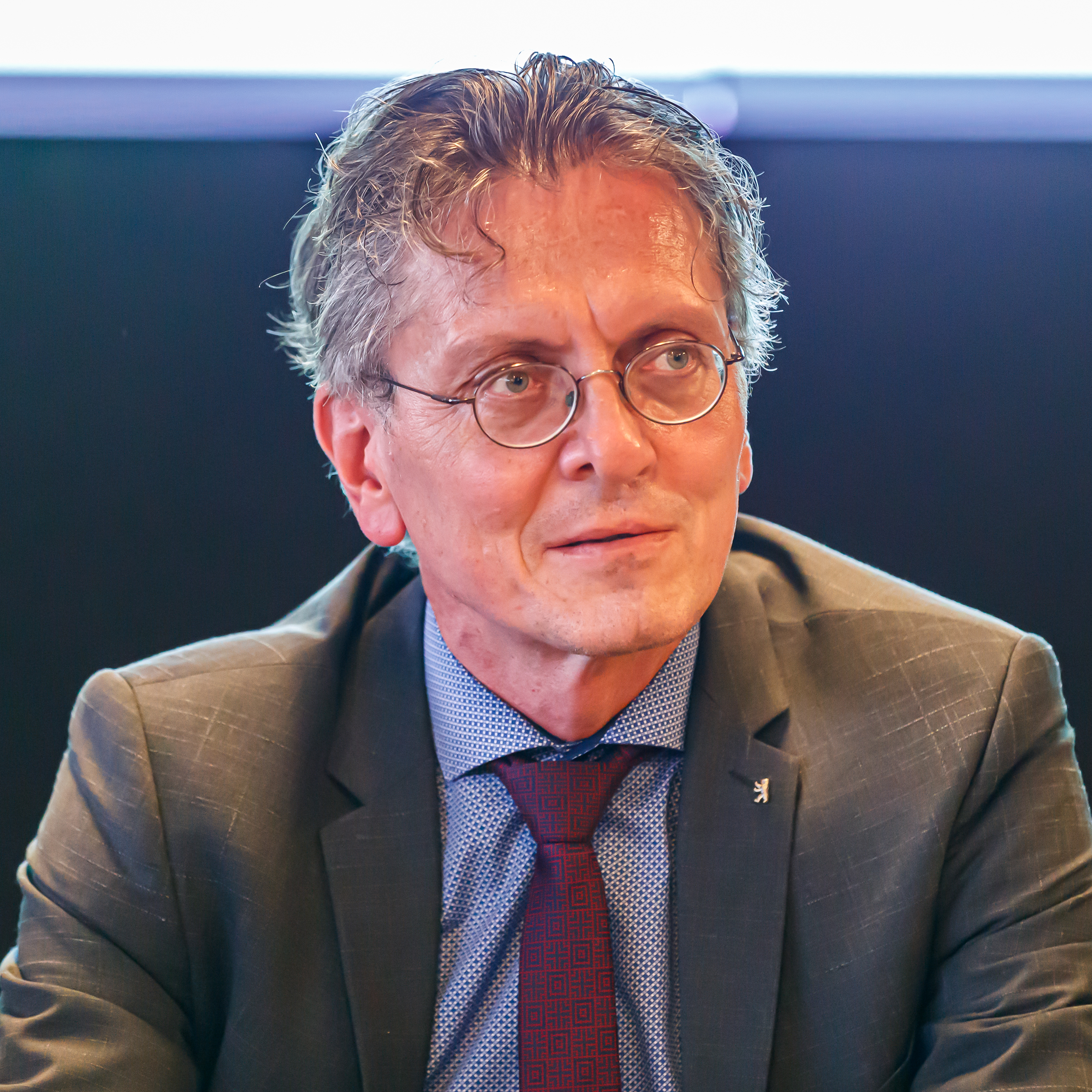
Christian Gaebler (2023)

Christian Gaebler (born 8 December 1964) is a German politician (SPD). Since April 2023, he has been the Senator for Urban Development, Construction, and Housing of the state of Berlin in the Wegner senate. Previously, he served as state secretary in the Senate Department for Urban Development and the Environment (2011–2016), in the Senate Department for Interior and Sport (2016–2018), in the Senate Department for Urban Development, Construction, and Housing (2021–2023), and as Chief of the Senate Chancellery (2018–2021) of the state of Berlin.

== Early life ==
After graduating in 1982 from Schiller-Gymnasium in Berlin-Charlottenburg, Gaebler studied Transportation Engineering at Technische Universität Berlin, specializing in Planning and Operations. In 1992, he graduated as a Diplom Engineer. Following this, until 1995, he worked as a research assistant and project manager at private planning offices. From January 1996 to 2001, he worked as an independent transportation planner.

Since 2003, Gaebler has been running a restaurant at Oranienplatz in Berlin-Kreuzberg, in partnership with Robert Krainovic. The restaurant, which he took over from Andreas Matthae, is considered a meeting place for Berlin politicians.

Gaebler is a member of the TRANSNET union and the German Society for Transport Sciences.

== Political career ==
Gaebler joined the SPD (Social Democratic Party of Germany) in 1981. In the Berlin-Wilmersdorf district, he served as the local chairman of the Jusos from 1983 to 1985 and, starting from 1989, became a member of the local executive committee of the SPD. Since 1996, he held the position of district chairman and continued this role in the merged Charlottenburg-Wilmersdorf district from 2000 onwards. On April 13, 2018, he announced his intention to step down from the district chairmanship in 2019.

During his studies, Gaebler was a member of the Student Parliament and the General Student Committee of Technische Universität Berlin, as well as a member of the board of the Berlin Student Union. He served as a student and as a representative on the (dormant) board of trustees of TU-Berlin.

From 1992 to 1995, Gaebler served as a citizen deputy in the Committee for Economics and Real Estate of the Wilmersdorf District Assembly.

Gaebler was a member of the Berlin House of Representatives from 1995 to 2011. In the elections of 1995 and 1999, he was elected through the SPD's Wilmersdorf district list. In 2001 and 2006, he entered parliament as a direct candidate in the Charlottenburg-Wilmersdorf constituency 7.

His main areas of focus included both transportation and science and research. He served as the spokesperson for transportation policy for the SPD faction starting from 1999. Within the faction board, he was an assessor from 1997 to 1998 and then became the deputy chairman from 1998 to 2001.

From 2001, he became the parliamentary managing director of the faction. In the House of Representatives, he was also a member of the Council of Elders and the Committee for Urban Development and Transportation. He belonged to the left wing (Parliamentary Left) of the SPD faction.

In the 2011 election, he couldn't retain his constituency seat and eventually left the House of Representatives.

== Senator ==
On April 27, 2023, Gaebler was appointed Senator for Urban Development, Building, and Housing in the Wegner senate.
