= Black–red–green coalition =

Form of German political coalition government

Flag of Kenya, which features the black-red-green colour scheme, hence the coalition's nickname

The Black–red–green coalition (German: Schwarz-rot-grüne Koalition), also known as the Kenya coalition (German: Kenia-Koalition) is a term in German politics describing a governing coalition among the parties of the Christian Democratic Union (CDU), Social Democratic Party (SPD) and the Green Party. The name comes from the traditional colours of the parties, with the CDU represented by black, the SPD by red, and the Greens by green. As these are also the colours of the Kenyan flag, the name of that country is sometimes applied to the arrangement, in the same manner as the black–yellow–green "Jamaica coalition".

== History ==
The government formed following the 2016 Saxony-Anhalt state election was the first such black–red–green coalition government formation in Germany. Two more such coalitions were formed after the 2019 Brandenburg state election and 2019 Saxony state elections, which took place on the same day. In Brandenburg, the coalition was led by the SPD, while in Saxony, it was led by the CDU.
