= Katharina Günther-Wünsch =

German politician

Günther-Wünsch
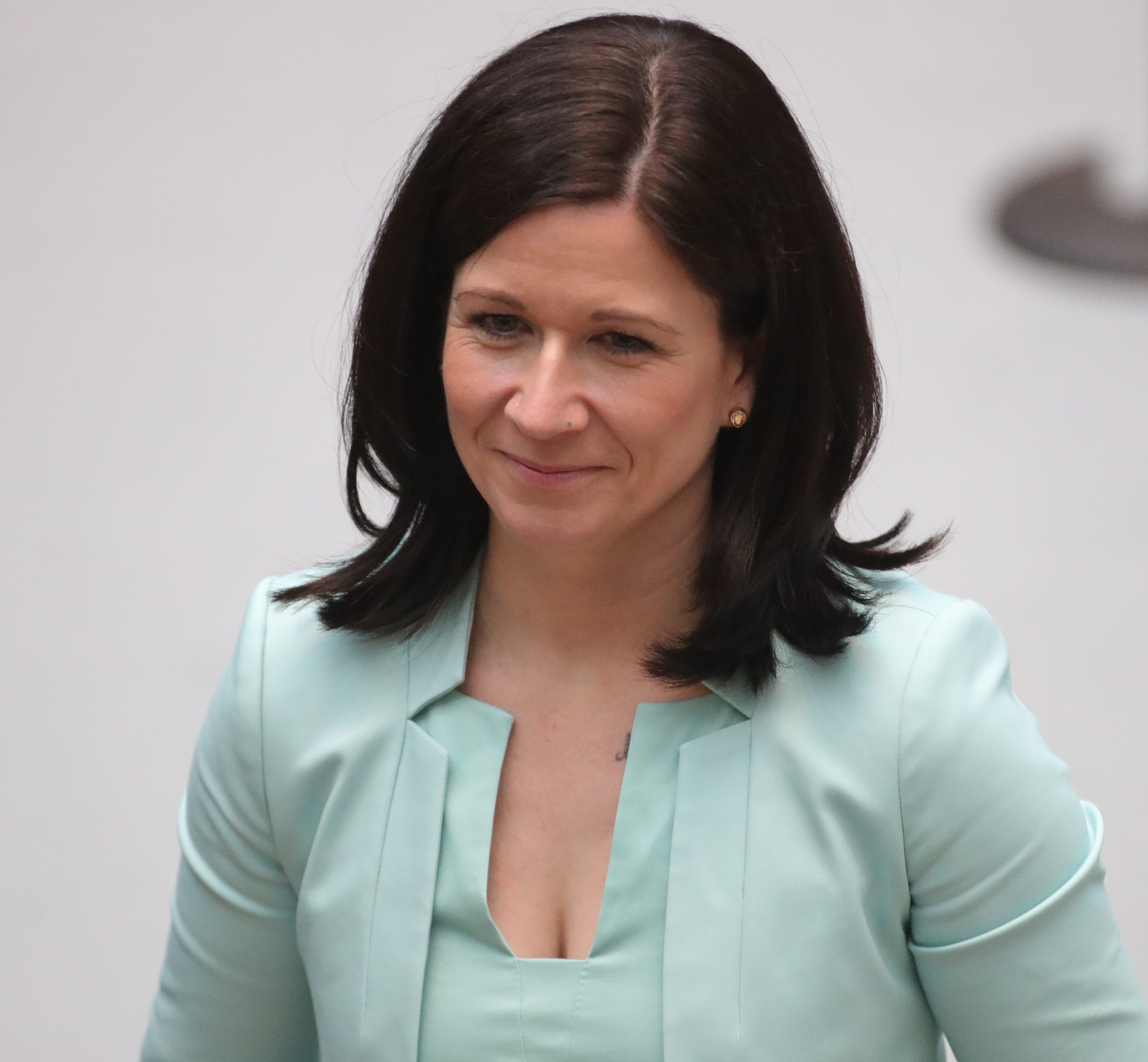
- Katharina Günther-Wünsch

Senator for Education, Youth, and Family in Berlin
- Incumbent
- Assumed office April 27, 2023

Personal details
- Born: April 3, 1983 (age 42) Dresden, East Germany
- Party: CDU
- Occupation: Politician

Katharina Günther-Wünsch (born April 3, 1983, in Dresden) is a German politician. She is a member of the CDU (Christian Democratic Union). Since April 2023, she has been serving as the Senator for Education, Youth, and Family of the State of Berlin in the Wegner Senate and, as of May 5, 2023, has been the President of the Conference of Ministers of Education.

== Life ==
=== Education and career ===
Katharina Günther-Wünsch grew up in Dresden Mockritz as the daughter of a police officer and a medical assistant, alongside her three siblings. After graduating from Annen-Gymnasium in Dresden in 2001, she initially studied Human medicine until 2006, then pursued Chemistry, Mathematics, and History for high school teaching at the Dresden University of Technology until 2010. From February 2007 to May 2007, she taught at the Deutsche Höhere Privatschule Windhoek in Namibia and South Africa. Between 2010 and 2012, she completed her teaching internship at Wilhelm-von-Siemens-Gymnasium in Dresden. Starting in 2013, she served as a high school teacher at Walter-Gropius-Schule in Gropiusstadt, Neukölln, becoming the deputy headteacher there from 2017 to 2021 (from 2018, holding the position of senior school director).

=== Politics ===
Since 2013, Günther-Wünsch has been involved in Berlin's municipal politics, actively supporting the CDU district association Wuhletal. Since 2016, she has served as the deputy chairperson of the CDU local association Kaulsdorf-Mahlsdorf and has been a member of the District Assembly (BVV) of Marzahn-Hellersdorf. She was deputy faction leader for the CDU faction in the BVV and was a member of the Education, Youth Welfare, and Equality committees.

In 2021, the CDU district association Wuhletal nominated Günther-Wünsch for a direct mandate in the Marzahn-Hellersdorf 5 constituency, placing her third on the district list for the Berlin state election. She secured the direct mandate with 33.7 percent of the votes and entered the Berlin House of Representatives. There, Günther-Wünsch serves on the committees for Education, Youth, and Family, Environment, Consumer Protection, and Climate Protection, as well as Sports. She was an assessor in the Presidium of the Berlin House of Representatives and was the education policy spokesperson for the CDU parliamentary group in the House of Representatives. In the repeat election of 2023, she successfully defended her seat in the House of Representatives.

On April 27, 2023, she was appointed Senator for Education, Youth, and Family in the Wegner senate.

Additionally, she served as an assessor in the State Executive Committee of the CDU Berlin for some time.
