= Kai Wegner =

German politician (born 1972)

Kai Wegner MdA MdBR
- Wegner in 2025

Governing Mayor of Berlin
- Incumbent
- Assumed office 27 April 2023
- Deputy: Franziska Giffey; Stefan Evers
- Preceded by: Franziska Giffey

Leader of the Christian Democratic Union in Berlin
- In office 18 May 2019 – 13 July 2026
- General Secretary: Stefan Evers
- Deputy: Cerstin Richter-Kotowski; Frank Balzer; Manja Schreiner; Falko Liecke
- Preceded by: Monika Grütters
- Succeeded by: Stefan Evers
Parliamentary positions
Leader of the Christian Democratic Union in the Abgeordnetenhaus of Berlin
In office 30 September 2021 – 27 April 2023
Whips	Stefan Evers; Heiko Melzer
Preceded by	Burkard Dregger
Succeeded by	Dirk Stettner
Member of the; Berlin House of Representatives
Incumbent
Assumed office 4 November 2021
Preceded by	Peter Trapp
Constituency	Spandau 5
In office 29 October 1999 – October 2005
Preceded by	Constituency established
Succeeded by	Marcus Weichert
Constituency	Spandau 1 (1999–2001); Spandau (2001–2005)
Member of the Bundestag; from Berlin
In office 18 October 2005 – 26 October 2021
Constituency	State list (2005–2009); Berlin-Spandau – Charlottenburg North (2009–2017); State list (2017–2021)

Personal details
- Born: Kai Peter Wegner; 15 September 1972 (age 54) Spandau, West Berlin, West Germany
- Party: Christian Democratic Union (since 1989)
- Children: 3
- Occupation: Politician; Consultant; Insurance Agent
- Website: Official website

Military service
- Allegiance: Germany
- Branch/service: Bundeswehr
- Years of service: 1993–1994
- Unit: Air Force (Luftwaffe)

Kai Wegner (born 15 September 1972) is a German politician of the Christian Democratic Union (CDU) who has served as Governing Mayor of Berlin since April 2023. From May 2019 to July 2026, he served as leader of the CDU in Berlin. He represented his home district of Spandau in the Bundestag from 2005 to 2021, as well as in the Berlin House of Representatives from 1999 to 2005 and again since 2021.

On 10 July 2026, he announced that he would not seek re-election as mayor in the 2026 Berlin state election. He is expected to leave office once his successor is elected by the Berlin House of Representatives.

== Life and career ==
Wegner was born and raised in the Berlin borough of Spandau, the son of a construction worker and a retail sales clerk. After attending the Hans-Carossa-Oberschule on Streitstraße in the Hakenfelde district—which he left with an intermediate secondary school certificate (Realschulabschluss) rather than a university entrance qualification (Abitur)—Wegner completed military service in the German Air Force from 1993 to 1994. He subsequently completed an apprenticeship as an insurance clerk, finishing in 1997. Following this, he worked in the sales department of an insurance company until 1999, when he moved to a medium-sized construction company as a public relations project manager. From 2001 to 2002, he was also a member of its executive management. From 2002 to 2012, he worked as a self-employed management consultant in Berlin. From 2017 to 2020, he served as the honorary president of the Berlin state association of the DLRG (German Life Saving Association). He is a member of the board of trustees of the Margot Friedländer Foundation.

== Political career ==
=== Member of the German Parliament (2005–2021) ===
Wegner joined the CDU in 1989 and served as vice chair of the party in Berlin from 2000 to 2002.

Wegner was a member of the German Bundestag from the 2005 until 2021, representing Berlin's Spandau district. In parliament, he served on the Committee on Economic Affairs and Energy from 2005 until 2013 before moving to the Committee on Building, Housing, Urban Development and Local Government and the Committee on the Environment, Nature Conservation and Nuclear Safety. In this capacity, he was his parliamentary group's spokesperson on building and housing since 2018.

From 2011 until 2016, Wegner served as secretary general of the CDU in Berlin, under the leadership of chairman Frank Henkel. In May 2019 he succeeded Monika Grütters as chair of the CDU in Berlin.

=== Member of the State Parliament of Berlin (2021–present) ===
In October 2020, Wegner announced his candidacy for Governing Mayor of Berlin in the 2021 Berlin state election; he eventually lost against Franziska Giffey. He has since been serving as his parliamentary group's chairperson and thereby the leader of the opposition.

Wegner was appointed as CDU delegate to the Federal Conventions for the purpose of electing the President of Germany in 2022.

=== Mayor of Berlin (2023–present) ===
Following the large gains made by the CDU in the 2023 Berlin state election, Wegner became Berlin’s first conservative mayor in 22 years and formed the Wegner senate.

In April 2024, Wegner condemned a conference of pro-Palestinian activists in Berlin held during the Israeli invasion of the Gaza Strip, saying that "Berlin does not tolerate antisemitism, hatred, and incitement against Jews."

After a power outage in Berlin, which affected approximately 45,000 households for several days in January 2026, Wegner was criticized for failing to take sufficient action. Wegner initially responded to the allegations by saying he had been “on the phone all day” coordinating the situation and that he had “locked himself in his home office.” However, research by RBB and Tagesspiegel found that, contrary to his account, Wegner had left the house and played tennis. Contrary to his own account, he had only been in contact with the federal government and the relevant district mayor in the afternoon after his tennis match. Wegner subsequently apologized for “communication errors.”

== Other activities ==
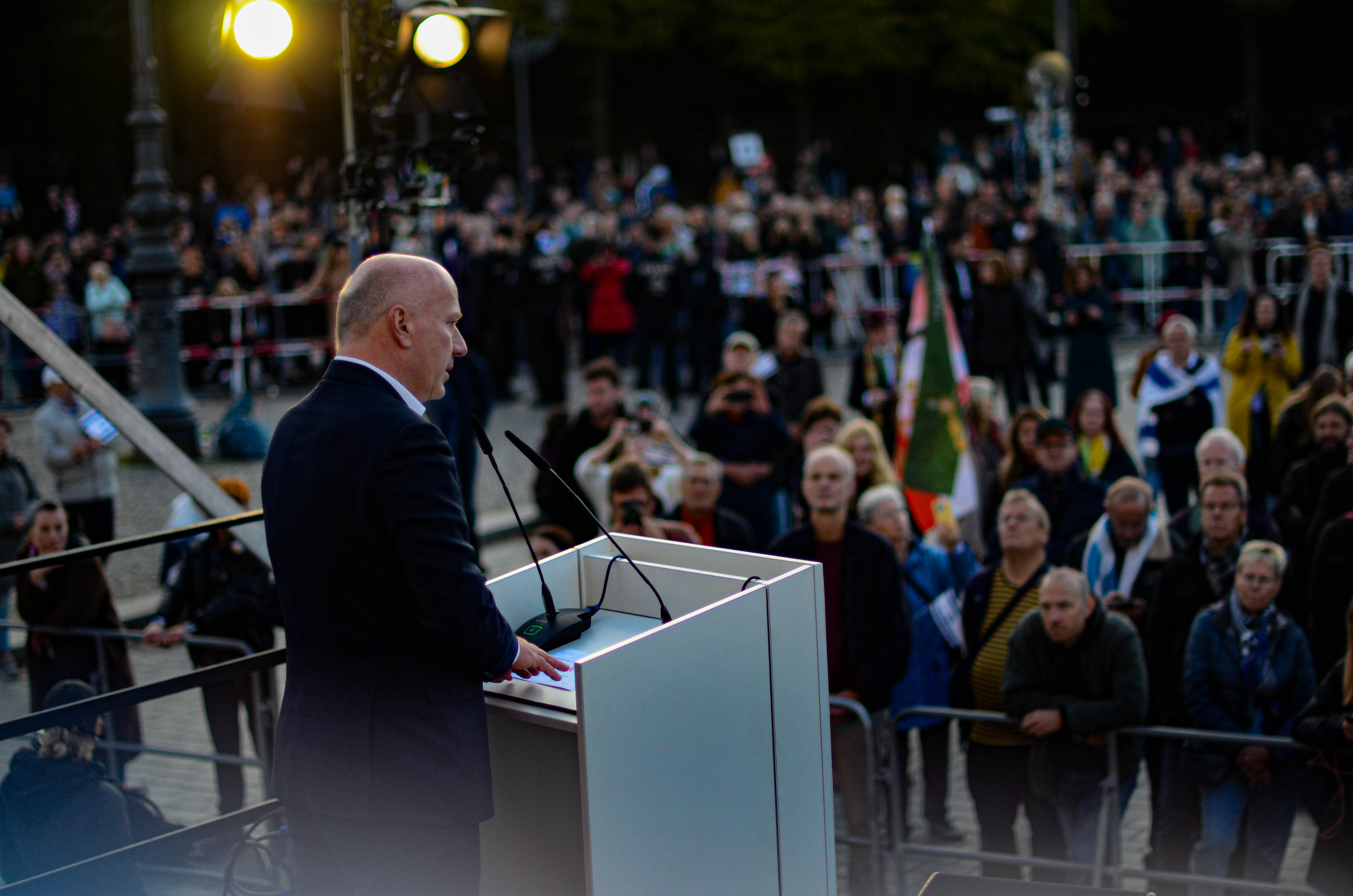
Kai Wegner speaking at a demonstration against antisemitism in Berlin, October 2023

- Development and Peace Foundation (SEF), Member of the Board of Trustees (since 2023)
- Foundation for the Humboldt Forum in the Berlin Palace, Member of the Council (since 2018)
- Memorial to the Murdered Jews of Europe Foundation, Member of the Board of Trustees
- Trade Union of the Police (GdP), Member
- Hertha BSC, Member
- Tennis

== Political positions ==
In June 2017, Wegner voted against his parliamentary group's majority and in favor of Germany's introduction of same-sex marriage.

Ahead of the 2021 Christian Democratic Union of Germany leadership election, Wegner first endorsed in 2020 Friedrich Merz and later Jens Spahn to succeed Annegret Kramp-Karrenbauer as the party's chair. For the 2021 German federal election, he later endorsed Markus Söder as the Christian Democrats' joint candidate to succeed Chancellor Angela Merkel.

When Merz argued in 2023 that the Christian Democrats may look to work together with the far-right Alternative for Germany at the municipal level, Wegner sought to distance himself from that suggestion, arguing on Twitter that "the CDU cannot, doesn't want to, and will not cooperate with a party whose business model is hate, division and exclusion."

== Personal life ==
Wegner lives in Spandau, Berlin. He is Protestant, divorced, and has two children with his second wife and one with his first wife.
