= List of honorary citizens of Berlin =

Coat of arms of Berlin

Recipients of the honorary citizenship of Berlin (German: Ehrenbürger von Berlin), in order of date of presentation. In total 119 people have been awarded honorary citizenship.

== 1813–1850 ==
1. Konrad Gottlieb Ribbeck
2. Heinrich Falckenberg
3. Gebhard Leberecht von Blücher
4. Ernst Ludwig Heim
5. Ludwig Matthias Nathanael Gottlieb von Brauchitsch
6. Friedrich von Schuckmann
7. Carl Friedrich Ludwig von Gontard
8. Friedrich Hansmann
9. Carl Friedrich Heinrich Graf von Wylich und Lottum
10. Heinrich von Gerlach
11. Friedrich August von Staegemann
12. Ludwig Wilhelm Neumann
13. Nicholas I of Russia
14. Johann Philipp von Ladenberg
15. Karl Albert von Kamptz
16. Gustav von Rauch
17. Friedrich Magnus von Bassewitz
18. Karl Freiherr von Müffling
19. Hermann von Boyen
20. Carl Streckfuß
21. Johann Christian Krüger
22. Ludwig von Borstell
23. Johann David Heegewaldt
24. Carl August Alsleben
25. Eugen von Puttkammer
26. Christian von Rother
27. Heinrich von Gagern
28. Friedrich Wilhelm, Count Brandenburg
29. Friedrich Graf von Wrangel

== 1851–1900 ==
1. Otto Theodor von Manteuffel
2. Christian Daniel Rauch
3. Alexander von Humboldt
4. Eduard Heinrich von Flottwell
5. August Böckh
6. Samuel Marot
7. Heinrich Wilhelm Krausnick
8. Otto von Bismarck
9. Helmuth von Moltke the Elder
10. Friedrich Heinrich Eduard Kochhann
11. Heinrich Schliemann
12. Leopold von Ranke
13. Robert Koch
14. Rudolf Virchow
15. Adolph Menzel
16. Paul Langerhans
17. Heinrich Bertram

== 1904–1949 ==
1. Arthur Hobrecht
2. Albert Haack
3. Arnold Marggraff
4. Martin Kirschner
5. Paul Michelet
6. Oskar Cassel
7. Ferdinand Straßmann
8. Ludwig Hoffmann
9. Hermann Bamberg
10. Hugo Heimann
11. Max Liebermann
12. Paul von Hindenburg (Honorary citizenship rescinded)
13. Adolf Hitler (Honorary citizenship rescinded)
14. Hermann Göring (Honorary citizenship rescinded)
15. Joseph Goebbels (Honorary citizenship rescinded)
16. Wilhelm Frick (Honorary citizenship rescinded)
17. Paul Lincke
18. Wilhelm Pieck (Honorary citizenship rescinded)
19. Rudolf Wissell
20. Theodor Heuss

== 1955–2000 ==
1. Paul Löbe
2. Louise Schroeder
3. Jakob Kaiser
4. F. K. Otto Dibelius
5. Marie Elisabeth Lüders
6. Heinrich Lübke
7. Lucius D. Clay
8. Meliton Kantaria
9. Otto Heinrich Warburg
10. Konrad Adenauer
11. Nelly Sachs
12. Otto Hahn
13. Hans Scharoun
14. Otto Nagel
15. Heinrich Zille
16. Karl Schmidt-Rottluff
17. Heinrich Grüber
18. Willy Brandt
19. Ferdinand Friedensburg
20. Franz Neumann
21. Hans Reif
22. Herbert von Karajan
23. Gustav Heinemann
24. Nikolai Berzarin
25. Anna Seghers
26. Valery Bykovsky
27. Sigmund Jähn
28. Walter Scheel
29. Johann Baptist Gradl
30. Shepard Stone
31. Wolfgang Heinz
32. Karl Carstens
33. John J. McCloy
34. Wieland Herzfelde
35. Heinz Galinski
36. Helmut Schmidt
37. Richard von Weizsäcker
38. Mikhail Gorbachev
39. Helmut Kohl
40. Ronald Reagan
41. Hans-Dietrich Genscher
42. Edzard Reuter
43. Roman Herzog
44. George H. W. Bush
45. Dietrich Fischer-Dieskau

== 2002–present ==
1. Egon Bahr
2. Marlene Dietrich
3. Johannes Rau
4. Heinz Berggruen
5. Wolf Biermann
6. Werner Otto
7. Joachim Gauck
8. W. Michael Blumenthal
9. Wolfgang Schäuble
10. Inge Deutschkron
11. Margot Friedländer
12. Frank-Walter Steinmeier
13. Daniel Barenboim

== Notes ==
The honorary citizenships of Wilhelm Frick, Adolf Hitler, Joseph Goebbels, Hermann Göring, and Wilhelm Pieck have been revoked. The honorary citizenship of Nikolai Berzarin was revoked in 1992 but was restored in 2003.
