= List of mayors of Berlin =

The following is a chronological list of mayors of Berlin, the capital city and city-state of Germany. The mayors are the head of the city-state, part of the senate of Berlin.

== List ==
=== Napoleonic Empire (1806–1809) ===
In 1806 the French occupants gathered 2,000 wealthy Berliners in St. Peter's Church in order to elect the Grand conseil (grand council) of sixty members again electing the Comité administratif (administrative committee). This body of seven elected burghers was the provisional city government competent to carry out the orders of the occupation power, especially to raise the French war contributions by levying them mostly from the 2,000 eligible voters. The président of the committee was the Berlin-based Prussian publisher:

| Portrait | Name (Birth–Death) | Term of office | | | Political party |
| Portrait | Name (Birth–Death) | Took office | Left office | Days | Political party |
|---|---|---|---|---|---|
| 1 | François Théodore de Lagarde (1756–1824) | 27 October 1806 | 6 July 1809 | 983 | Unknown |

=== Lord Mayor of the Royal Capital Berlin (1809–1920) ===
Political party: Independent SPD

| Portrait | Name (Birth–Death) | Term of office | | | Political party |
| Portrait | Name (Birth–Death) | Took office | Left office | Days | Political party |
Kingdom of Prussia (until 1867)
Berlin was the capital city of the Kingdom of Prussia
| 1 | Leopold von Gerlach (1757–1813) | 6 July 1809 | 8 June 1813 | 1433 | Non-partisan |
| 2 | Johann Gottfried Büsching (1761–1833) | February 1814 | March 1832 | 6603 | Non-partisan |
| 3 | Friedrich von Bärensprung (1779–1841) | March 1832 | 6 October 1834 | 949 | Non-partisan |
| 4 | Wilhelm Krausnick (1797–1882) | 6 October 1834 | 20 March 1848 | 4914 | Non-partisan |
| – | Franz Christian Naunyn (1799–1860); Acting | 20 March 1848 | 23 January 1851 | 1039 | Non-partisan |
| (4) | Wilhelm Krausnick (1797–1882) | 23 January 1851 | 30 December 1862 | 4359 | Non-partisan |
| 5 | Karl Theodor Seydel (1812–1873) | 12 January 1863 | 18 January 1871 | 1492 | Non-partisan |
German Empire (1867–1918)
Berlin was the capital city of the Kingdom of Prussia, which is since 1871 part of the German Reich
| (5) | Karl Theodor Seydel (1812–1873) | 18 January 1871 | 1 April 1872 | 439 | Non-partisan |
| 6 | Arthur Hobrecht (1824–1912) | 16 May 1872 | 1 April 1878 | 2146 | National Liberal Party |
| 7 | Max von Forckenbeck (1824–1892) | 21 November 1878 | 26 May 1892 | 4935 | National Liberal Party |
| 8 | Robert Zelle (1829–1901) | 26 September 1892 | 30 September 1898 | 2191 | Free-minded People's Party |
| 9 | Martin Kirschner (1842–1912) | 23 December 1899 | 31 August 1912 | 4634 | Non-partisan |
| 10 | Adolf Wermuth (1855–1927) | 1 September 1912 | 9 November 1918 | 2260 | Non-partisan |
Weimar Republic (1918–1933)
| (10) | Adolf Wermuth (1855–1927) | 9 November 1918 | 1 October 1920 | 692 | Non-partisan |

=== Lord Mayor of (Greater) Berlin (1918–1945) ===
| Portrait | Name (Birth–Death) | Term of office | | | Political party |
| Portrait | Name (Birth–Death) | Took office | Left office | Days | Political party |
Weimar Republic (1918–1933)
Berlin was the capital city of the Weimar Republic
| (10) | Adolf Wermuth (1855–1927) | 1 October 1920 | 30 November 1920 | 60 | Non-partisan |
| 11 | Gustav Böß (1873–1946) | 10 February 1921 | 7 November 1929 | 3192 | German Democratic Party |
| – | Arthur Scholtz (1871–1935); Acting | 7 November 1929 | 20 April 1931 | 692 | German People's Party |
| 12 | Heinrich Sahm (1877–1939) | 20 April 1931 | 30 January 1933 | 651 | Non-partisan |
Nazi Germany (1933–1945)
Berlin was the capital city of Nazi Germany
| (12) | Heinrich Sahm (1877–1939) | 30 January 1933 | 18 December 1935 | 1052 | Non-partisan (until 1933); Nazi Party (from 1933) |
| – | Oskar Maretzky (1881–1945); Acting | 19 December 1935 | 5 January 1937 | 383 | Nazi Party (Not party-member) |
| 13 | Julius Lippert (1895–1956) | 5 January 1937 | 1 July 1940 | 1273 | Nazi Party |
| 14 | Ludwig Steeg (1894–1945) | 1 July 1940 | 2 May 1945 | 1766 | Nazi Party |

=== City President of Berlin (1935–1945) ===
The Nazi government introduced a new unitary municipal ordinance for all German municipalities and cities accounting for the de facto abolition of municipal democracy and autonomy since the Nazi takeover in 1933. According to the new ordinance the administrative head of the city was now titled Stadtpräsident (City President). The Oberbürgermeister remained in a ceremonial role.

Political party: NSDAP

| Portrait | Name (Birth–Death) | Term of office | | | Political party |
| Portrait | Name (Birth–Death) | Took office | Left office | Days | Political party |
Nazi Germany (1933–1945)
Berlin was the capital city of Nazi Germany
| 1 | Heinrich Sahm (1877–1939) | 30 January 1935 | 18 December 1935 | 322 | Nazi Party |
| – | Oskar Maretzky (1881–1945); Acting | 19 December 1935 | 5 January 1937 | 383 | Nazi Party (Not party-member) |
| 2 | Julius Lippert (1895–1956) | 5 January 1937 | 1 July 1940 | 1273 | Nazi Party |
| 3 | Ludwig Steeg (1894–1945) | 1 July 1940 | 2 May 1945 | 1376 | Nazi Party |
| 4 | Joseph Goebbels (1897–1945) | 7 April 1944 | 1 May 1945 | 390 | Nazi Party |

=== Lord Mayor of Greater Berlin under Allied occupation (1945–1948) ===
Following Berlin's provisional post-war constitution, enacted under quadripartite Allied rule, the head of city government was titled again Oberbürgermeister (generally "Lord Mayor").

Political party: IND SPD CDU

| Portrait | Name (Birth–Death) | Term of office | | | Political party |
| Portrait | Name (Birth–Death) | Took office | Left office | Days | Political party |
Berlin under quadripartite Allied control (1945–1948)
| 15 | Arthur Werner (1877–1967) | 17 May 1945 | 10 December 1946 | 572 | Non-partisan |
| 16 | Otto Ostrowski (1883–1963) | 10 December 1946 | 11 June 1947 | 183 | Social Democratic Party |
| – | Louise Schroeder (1887–1957); Acting (Note: Louise Schroeder replaced the Lord Mayor-elect Ernst Reuter, who was barred by Soviet veto.) | 11 June 1947 | 14 August 1948 | 430 | Social Democratic Party |
| – | Ferdinand Friedensburg (1886–1972); Acting for Schroeder (Note: Ferdinand Friedensburg was acting Lord Mayor of Great Berlin due to the illness of acting Lord Mayor Louise Schroeder during the Berlin Blockade in 1948. Schröder resumed her duties on 1 December 1948 and continued until Ernst Reuter was elected on 7 December 1948.) | 14 August 1948 | 1 December 1948 | 109 | Christian Democratic Union |
| – | Louise Schroeder (1887–1957); Acting | 1 December 1948 | 7 December 1948 | 6 | Social Democratic Party |
| 17 | Ernst Reuter (1889–1953) (West Berlin only) | 7 December 1948 | 1 February 1951 | 786 | Social Democratic Party |

=== Lord Mayor of Berlin (1948–1990) ===
Political party: SED PDS SPD

| Portrait | Name (Birth–Death) | Term of office | | | Political party |
| Portrait | Name (Birth–Death) | Took office | Left office | Days | Political party |
East Berlin (1948–1949)
East Berlin was under Soviet occupation and was fully controlled by them from November 1948 until the founding of the German Democratic Republic (East Germany).
| 1 | Friedrich Ebert Jr. (1894–1979) | 30 November 1948 | 7 October 1949 | 311 | Socialist Unity Party |
East Berlin (1948–1990)
East Berlin was de facto the capital city of the German Democratic Republic (East Germany)
| (1) | Friedrich Ebert Jr. (1894–1979) | 7 October 1949 | 5 July 1967 | 6480 | Socialist Unity Party |
| 2 | Herbert Fechner (1913–1998) | 5 July 1967 | 11 February 1974 | 2413 | Socialist Unity Party |
| 3 | Erhard Krack (1931–2000) | 11 February 1974 | 15 February 1990 | 5848 | Socialist Unity Party |
| – | Ingrid Pankraz (born 1948); Acting | 15 February 1990 | 23 February 1990 | 8 | Party of Democratic Socialism |
| 4 | Christian Hartenhauer (born 1948) | 23 February 1990 | 30 May 1990 | 96 | Party of Democratic Socialism |
| 5 | Tino Schwierzina (1927–2003) | 30 May 1990 | 3 October 1990 | 126 | Social Democratic Party in the GDR |
East Berlin was reunited with West Berlin on October 3, 1990 and dissolved.

=== Governing Mayor of Berlin (1951–present) ===
Political party: SPD CDU

| Portrait | Name (Birth–Death) | Term of office | | | Political party |
| Portrait | Name (Birth–Death) | Took office | Left office | Days | Political party |
West Berlin (1948–1990)
West Berlin was de facto part of the Federal Republic of Germany (West Germany)
| 1 | Ernst Reuter (1889–1953) | 1 February 1951 | 29 September 1953 | 971 | Social Democratic Party |
| 2 | Walther Schreiber (1884–1958) | 29 September 1953 | 11 January 1955 | 469 | Christian Democratic Union |
| 3 | Otto Suhr (1894–1957) | 11 January 1955 | 30 August 1957 (died in office) | 962 | Social Democratic Party |
| 4 | Willy Brandt (1913–1992) | 3 October 1957 | 1 December 1966 | 3346 | Social Democratic Party |
| 5 | Heinrich Albertz (1915–1993) | 1 December 1966 | 19 October 1967 | 322 | Social Democratic Party |
| 6 | Klaus Schütz (1926–2012) | 19 October 1967 | 2 May 1977 | 3483 | Social Democratic Party |
| 7 | Dietrich Stobbe (1938–2011) | 2 May 1978 | 23 January 1981 | 1362 | Social Democratic Party |
| 8 | Hans-Jochen Vogel (1926–2020) | 23 January 1981 | 11 June 1981 | 139 | Social Democratic Party |
| 9 | Richard von Weizsäcker (1920–2015) | 11 June 1981 | 9 February 1984 | 973 | Christian Democratic Union |
| 10 | Eberhard Diepgen (born 1941) | 9 February 1984 | 16 March 1989 | 1862 | Christian Democratic Union |
| 11 | Walter Momper (born 1945) | 16 March 1989 | 3 October 1990 | 566 | Social Democratic Party |
West Berlin was reunited with East Berlin on October 3, 1990 and dissolved.
Reunified Berlin (1990–present)
City-state and capital city of the Federal Republic of Germany
| | Walter Momper (born 1945) & Tino Schwierzina (1927–2003) | 3 October 1990 | 24 January 1991 | 113 | Social Democratic Party |
| 12 (10) | Eberhard Diepgen (born 1941) | 24 January 1991 | 16 June 2001 | 3796 | Christian Democratic Union |
| 13 | Klaus Wowereit (born 1953) | 16 June 2001 | 11 December 2014 | 4926 | Social Democratic Party |
| 14 | Michael Müller (born 1964) | 11 December 2014 | 21 December 2021 | 2567 | Social Democratic Party |
| 15 | Franziska Giffey (born 1978) | 21 December 2021 | 27 April 2023 | 492 | Social Democratic Party |
| 16 | Kai Wegner (born 1972) | 27 April 2023 | Incumbent | 1153 | Christian Democratic Union |
