= 1946 Berlin state election =

German state election

- 20 October 1946

All 130 seats in the Stadtverordnetenversammlung 66 seats needed for a majority
- Registered: 2,307,122
- Turnout: 2,128,677 (92.3%)
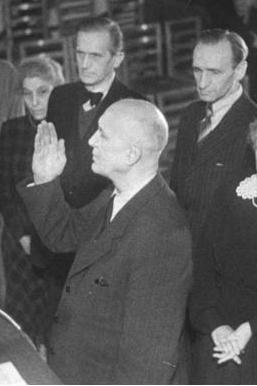

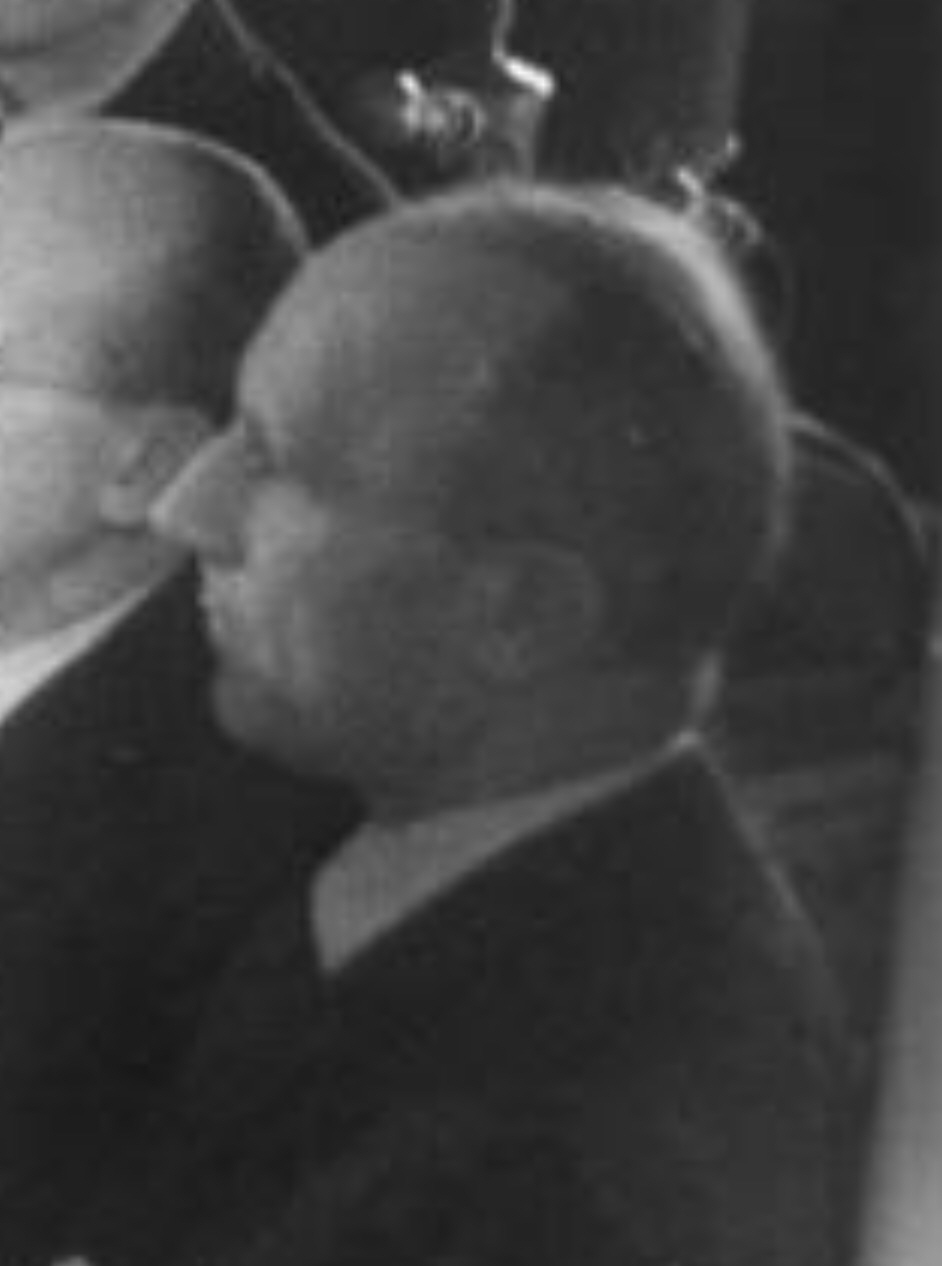

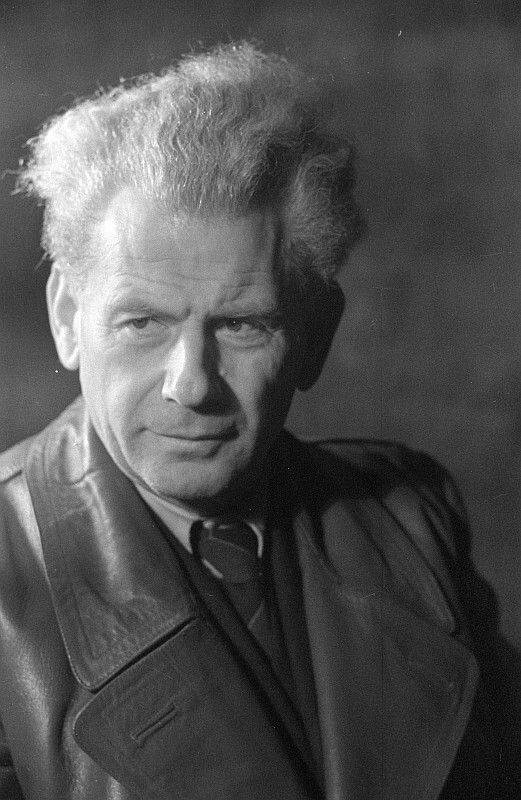
	First party	Second party
Candidate	Otto Ostrowski	Ferdinand Friedensburg
Party	SPD	CDU
Seats won	63	29
Popular vote	1,015,609	462,425
Percentage	48.7%	22.2%
	Third party	Fourth party
Candidate	Hermann Matern
Party	SED	LDPD
Seats won	26	12
Popular vote	412,582	194,722
Percentage	19.8%	9.3%
- Results of the election by borough. The size of each pie chart indicates the number of votes cast.
Mayor before election
Arthur Werner
Independent
Elected Mayor
Otto Ostrowski
SPD

The 1946 Greater Berlin City Council election (Stadtverordnetenversammlung von Groß-Berlin) was held on 20 October 1946 to elect all 130 members of the City Council. It was the only all-Berlin election in the period between the end of the Second World War and German reunification in 1990.

The clear winner of the election was the Social Democratic Party (SPD) led by Otto Ostrowski, which won 48.7% and 63 seats, just three short of a majority. The Christian Democratic Union finished in second place under Ferdinand Friedensburg with 22.2% of votes and 29 seats. The Socialist Unity Party (SED), formed a few months earlier as a merger of the Communist Party and the SPD branches in the Soviet zone, took just 19.8% of the vote and 26 seats. The remaining 9.3% of the votes went to the Liberal Democratic Party (LDP) which received 12 seats.

Voter turnout was 92.3%. The result was a clear rejection of the Socialist Unity Party, which was favored by the Soviet occupation authority, and of the CDU, which came to dominate politics in West Germany.

SPD leader Ostrowski was elected mayor by the City Council in December and formed a cabinet comprising all four parties. However, rising hostility between the SPD and SED saw him come under pressure to dismiss the SED members of the ministry. When he refused, the SPD put forward a motion of no confidence in the city council, which narrowly fell short of the two-thirds majority required to pass. However Ostrowski's position was untenable and he resigned a few days later on 17 April. He was replaced by Ernst Reuter, who took a strongly anti-SED and anti-Soviet stance. As a result, the Soviet authorities refused to consent to his appointment and Louise Schroeder became acting mayor. In 1948, the eastern district and Soviet authorities withdrew from the city council and government, de facto dividing the city.

== Results ==
Party	Votes	%	Seats
Social Democratic Party of Germany	1,015,609	48.70	63
Christian Democratic Union of Germany	462,425	22.18	29
Socialist Unity Party of Germany	412,582	19.78	26
Liberal Democratic Party	194,722	9.34	12
Total	2,085,338	100.00	130
Valid votes	2,085,338	97.96	
Invalid/blank votes	43,339	2.04	
Total votes	2,128,677	100.00	
Registered voters/turnout	2,307,122	92.27	
Source: Wahlen in Deutschland, Berliner Wahlergebnisse

Borough	SPD		CDU		LDPD		SED		Invalid
Charlottenburg	66,067	48.0	39,974	29.1	17,158	12.5	14,370	10.4	2,541
Friedrichshain	60,975	46.1	21,904	16.6	8,351	6.3	41,031	31.0	3,448
Köpenick	28,883	38.0	17,267	22.7	7,604	10.0	22,187	29.2	1,813
Kreuzberg	75,988	56.4	28,473	21.1	10,172	7.5	20,212	15.0	3,210
Lichtenberg	45,544	43.3	21,239	20.2	7,982	7.6	30,336	28.9	2,592
Mitte	38,071	47.7	14,060	17.6	4,916	6.2	22,791	28.5	2,154
Neukölln	103,410	56.4	32,193	17.6	14,407	7.9	33,283	18.2	3,447
Pankow	40,417	42.4	18,014	18.9	10,177	10.7	26,683	28.0	1,944
Prenzlauer Berg	76,298	45.3	28,877	17.1	11,763	7.0	51,458	30.6	4,024
Reinickendorf	61,781	51.9	24,839	20.9	10,655	9.0	21,713	18.2	2,074
Schöneberg	56,513	49.7	32,044	28.2	14,020	12.3	11,235	9.9	1,975
Spandau	56,197	56.4	22,366	22.4	10,127	10.2	11,014	11.0	2,372
Steglitz	39,801	44.8	28,495	32.1	14,109	15.9	6,402	7.2	1,378
Tempelhof	37,092	51.8	19,239	26.9	8,605	12.0	6,642	9.3	1,180
Tiergarten	38,616	53.4	17,725	24.5	5,984	8.3	10,012	13.8	1,439
Treptow	29,401	40.8	13,896	19.3	6,401	8.9	22,446	31.1	1,595
Wedding	81,015	53.1	26,879	17.6	8,969	5.9	35,838	23.5	3,377
Weißensee	21,811	40.8	10,963	20.5	4,095	7.7	16,526	31.0	1,155
Wilmersdorf	38,704	46.6	26,024	31.3	13,150	15.8	5,255	6.3	1,027
Zehlendorf	19,025	41.2	17,954	38.9	6,077	13.2	3,148	6.8	594

Zone	SPD		CDU		LDPD		SED		Invalid
Soviet Zone	341,400	43.6	146,220	18.7	61,289	7.8	233,458	29.8	18,725
French Zone	142,796	52.6	51,718	19.0	19,624	7.2	57,551	21.2	5,451
British Zone	199,584	50.8	106,089	27.0	46,419	11.8	40,651	10.4	7,379
American Zone	331,829	52.0	158,398	24.8	67,390	10.6	80,922	12.7	11,784
