= Wolfgang Scheunemann =

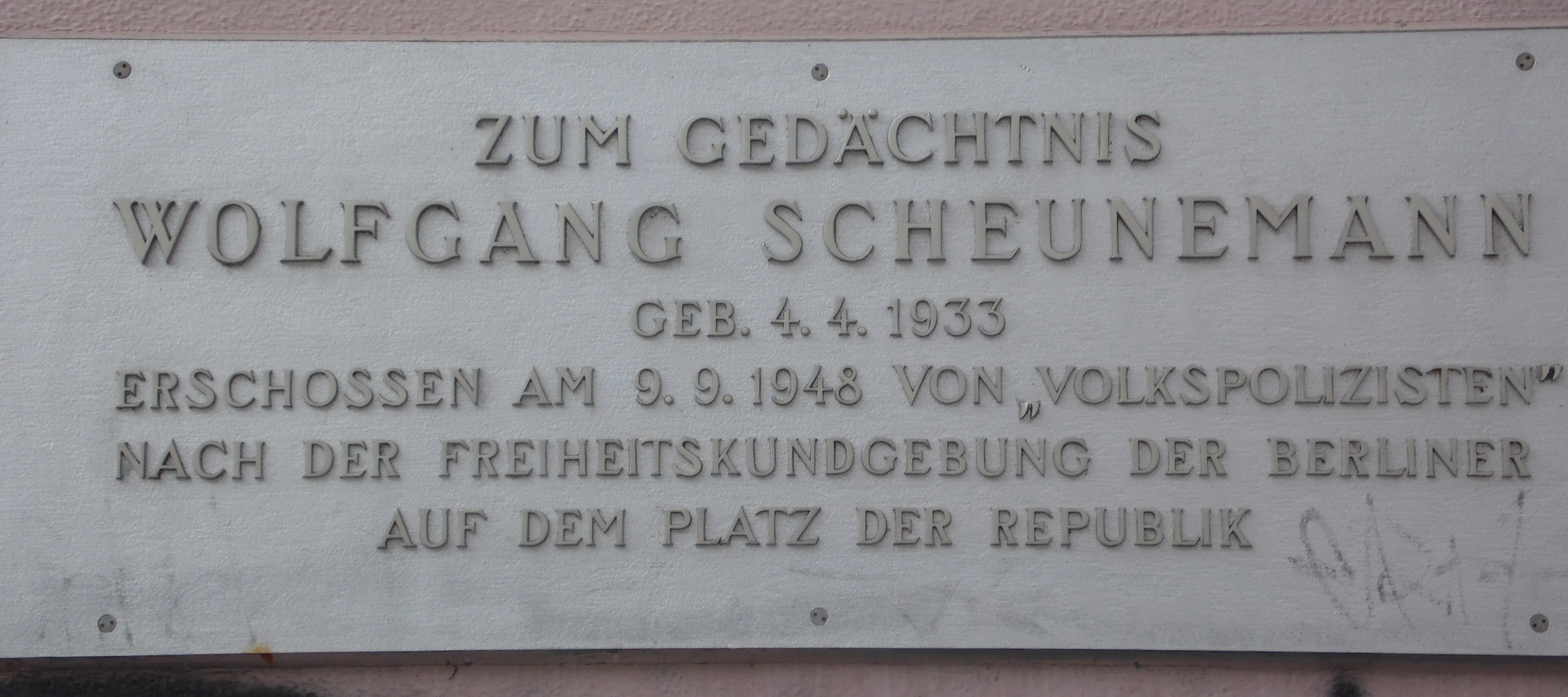
Memorial plaque at the Wolfgang Scheunemann House in Berlin-Moabit

Wolfgang Scheunemann (4 April 1933 – 9 September 1948) was the first victim shot by the Volkspolizei (VP) at the sector border in Berlin. He was shot during a VP operation in Unter den Linden during the Berlin Blockade.

== Death ==
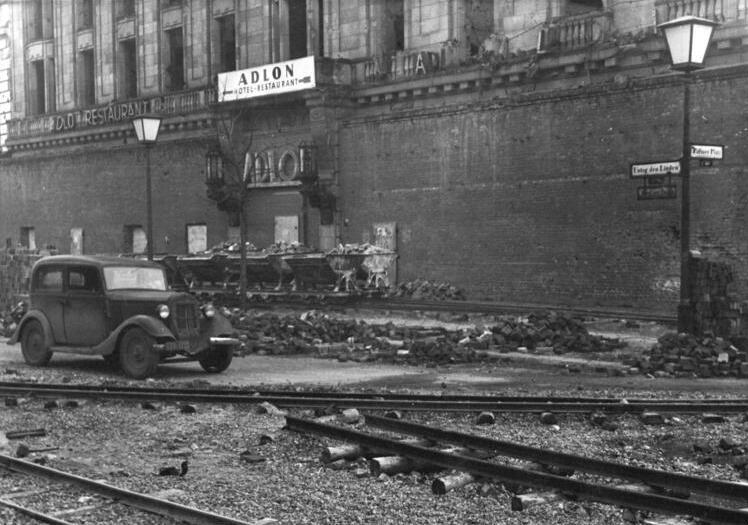
Unter den Linden, Hotel Adlon (1950). Scheunemann was fatally shot in about the third alcove to the left of the entrance

The schoolboy Wolfgang Scheunemann, son of a boilermaker, lived in the Berlin district of Moabit in the British sector. He was a group leader of the youth organization Die Falken, which belonged to the SPD.

On 9 September 1948, Scheunemann joined 300,000 Berliners at a rally on Platz der Republik. It was directed against the incipient division of Berlin through the blockade of the Western sectors and the violent expulsion of the freely elected city councillors and magistrate members from their seats in the Eastern sector by the Socialist Unity Party of Germany (SED) and the Soviet occupying power. The Berlin police force was already divided into a section under the VP president Paul Markgraf, who had been deposed by the Berlin magistrate but was kept in office in the Eastern sector by the Soviet city commander, and the police president Johannes Stumm, who had been appointed by the magistrate.

In the immediate vicinity of the rally, there were scuffles between demonstrators and the police at the sector border at the Brandenburg Gate. After the rally, at which Ernst Reuter (SPD) had delivered his renown speech "You peoples of the world [...] look at this city!", a procession formed under SPD chairman Franz Neumann to deliver a protest resolution to the Allied Control Council. The Kammergericht building was located in the American sector in Potsdamer Straße. Because of the mass of people jammed in Ebertstraße, numerous participants, including Scheunemann and a Falken member from Moabit, a 20-year-old nurse, took a detour through the Soviet sector. The route was to lead via the open Brandenburg Gate, Pariser Platz, the boulevard Unter den Linden, Wilhelmstraße and Leipziger Straße to Potsdamer Platz.

Since the beginning of the blockade, the Volkspolizei had controlled vehicle and traffic at the border to the Western sectors without turning back pedestrians. When policemen now tried to push the pedestrians streaming across Pariser Platz back to the gate from Unter den Linden, they were insulted by the crowd and pelted with stones. The police responded first with warning shots and then with shots into the crowd. In the ensuing turmoil, police arrested demonstrators while they attacked individual police officers and removed the red flag from the Brandenburg Gate to hoist a black, red and gold one. Scheunemann, who had taken refuge with the nurse from shots and stone throwing in an alcove of the ruins of the Hotel Adlon, was shot in the stomach by a policeman. The VP's use of firearms caused a further twelve injuries. Scheunemann died while being transported to Moabit Hospital. Although the West Berlin police had offered a large reward and interviewed numerous witnesses, they were unable to identify the perpetrator.

Scheunemann's death caused a great public stir in Berlin. The SPD-affiliated Telegraf newspaper emphasized that demonstrators had refused to accept the East Berlin police cordons. His death was taken by the Falcons as an obligation to "fight for and defend freedom". In the centenary year of the democratic 1948 March Revolution, a RIAS commemorative program placed Scheunemann in a row with the March martyrs of 1948.

The SED-controlled East Berlin press, especially the Berliner Zeitung, devoted a great deal of attention to the incidents at the Brandenburg Gate. They depicted them as a kind of social-democratic coup attempt, mainly carried out by the Falcons, organized by the "fascist provocateurs Reuter and Friedensburg", who had "equipped the thugs with firearms". The newspaper did not mention the death of 15-year-old Scheunemann.

Wolfgang Scheunemann was the only child of his parents. After he was laid out in front of Tiergarten Town Hall, where Franz Neumann spoke, around 10,000 people accompanied the deceased to his funeral at St. Johannis II Cemetery in Seestraße. A few weeks later, in apparent competition, the SED leadership dedicated a funeral to Fritz Maqué, a policeman who had been the victim of a fatal incident at the sector border, which far surpassed that of Scheunemann in terms of size and solemnity.

== Honor ==
A youth recreational facility in Berlin-Moabit, which was opened in 1961, was named Wolfgang Scheunemann House. There has been a memorial plaque there ever since.

== Bibliography ==
- Ulrich Pfeil, Corine Defrance, Bettina Greiner (Hrsg.): Die Berliner Luftbrücke. Erinnerungsort des Kalten Krieges. Ch. Links, 2018, ISBN 978-3-86153-991-9, S. 161–166.
- Gerhard Sälter, Johanna Dietrich, Fabian Kuhn: Wolfgang Scheunemann. In: dies.: Die vergessenen Toten. Todesopfer des DDR-Grenzregimes in Berlin von der Teilung bis zum Mauerbau (1948–1961). Ch. Links, Berlin 2016, ISBN 978-3-86153-933-9, S. 243–248.
- Heinrich Eppe (Hrsg.): Sozialistische Jugend im 20. Jahrhundert. Juventa, Weinheim/München 2008, ISBN 978-3-7799-1136-4, S. 276.
