= Erhard Krack =

German politician (1931–2000)

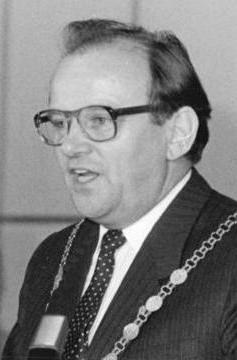
- Krack in 1987

Lord Mayor of East Berlin
- In office 12 February 1974 – 15 February 1990
- First Deputy: Gerhard Jung; Horst Palm; Hannelore Mensch
- Preceded by: Herbert Fechner
- Succeeded by: Ingrid Pankraz (acting)

Minister for Bezirk-managed and Food Industry
- In office 22 December 1965 – 14 February 1974
- Chairman of the Council of Ministers: Otto Grotewohl; Willi Stoph; Horst Sindermann
- First Deputy: Udo-Dieter Wange; Heinz Block
- Preceded by: Position established
- Succeeded by: Udo-Dieter Wange
Volkskammer
Member of the Volkskammer for East Berlin
In office 25 June 1981 – 5 April 1990
Preceded by	Constituency established
Succeeded by	Constituency abolished
Constituency	Berlin-Prenzlauer Berg, №1
In office 29 October 1976 – 25 June 1981
Appointed by	Magistrate of East Berlin

Personal details
- Born: 9 January 1931 Danzig, Free City of Danzig
- Died: 13 December 2000 (aged 69) Berlin, Germany
- Resting place: Friedhof Pankow III, Berlin
- Party: Socialist Unity Party of Germany (1951-1989)
- Education: University of Rostock
- Central institution membership: 1981–1989: Full member, Central Committee; 1976–1981: Candidate member, Central Committee; Other offices held: 1976–1990: Member, East Berlin City Assembly of Deputies; 1969–1990: Member, National Front National Council

Erhard Krack (9 January 1931 – 13 December 2000) was a German politician and mayor of East Berlin from 1974 to 1990.

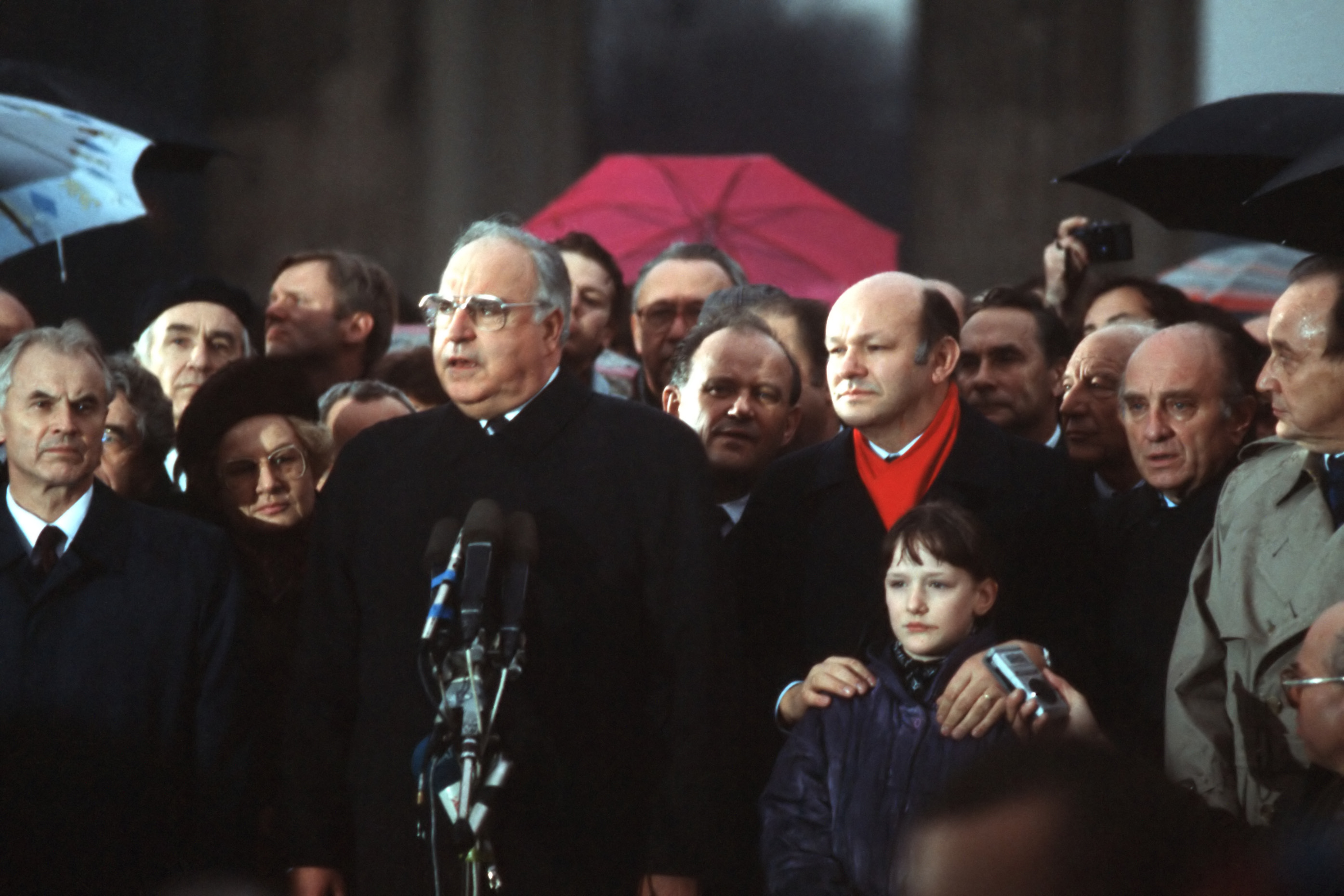
Hans Modrow, Helmut Kohl, and Walter Momper at the opening of the Brandenburg Gate on 22 December 1989 – Erhard Krack can be seen between the shoulders of Kohl and Momper.

== Life ==
Krack was born in Danzig on January 9, 1931. In 1951, he joined the Socialist Unity Party of Germany (SED). Between 1952 and 1956 Krack studied economics at the University of Rostock.

In 1965, Krack became the Minister of Regional Industry and the Food Industry.

In 1974, Krack became mayor of East Berlin, a post he would hold until 1990.

He was also a deputy in the Volkskammer and a member of the Central Committee of the SED.
