= Bersarinplatz =

Town square in the Berlin district Friedrichshain

Coordinates: 52.519°N 13.453°E

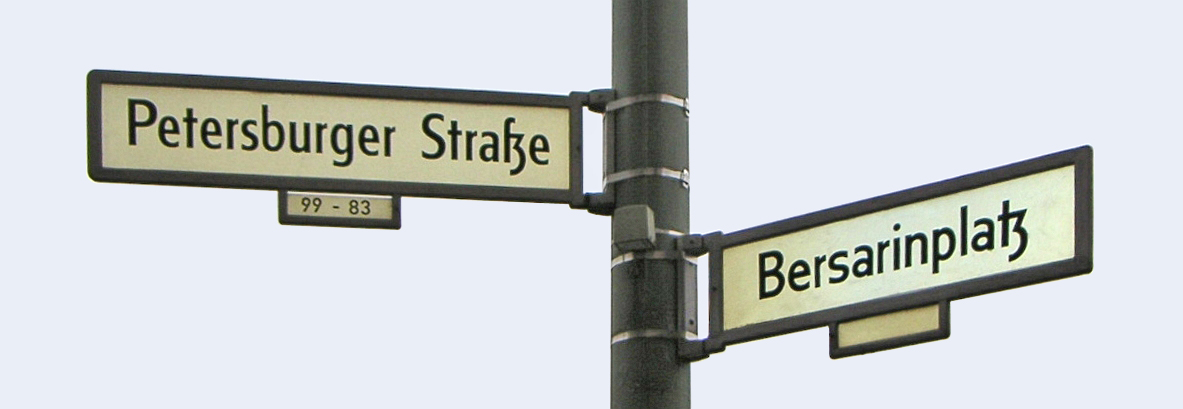

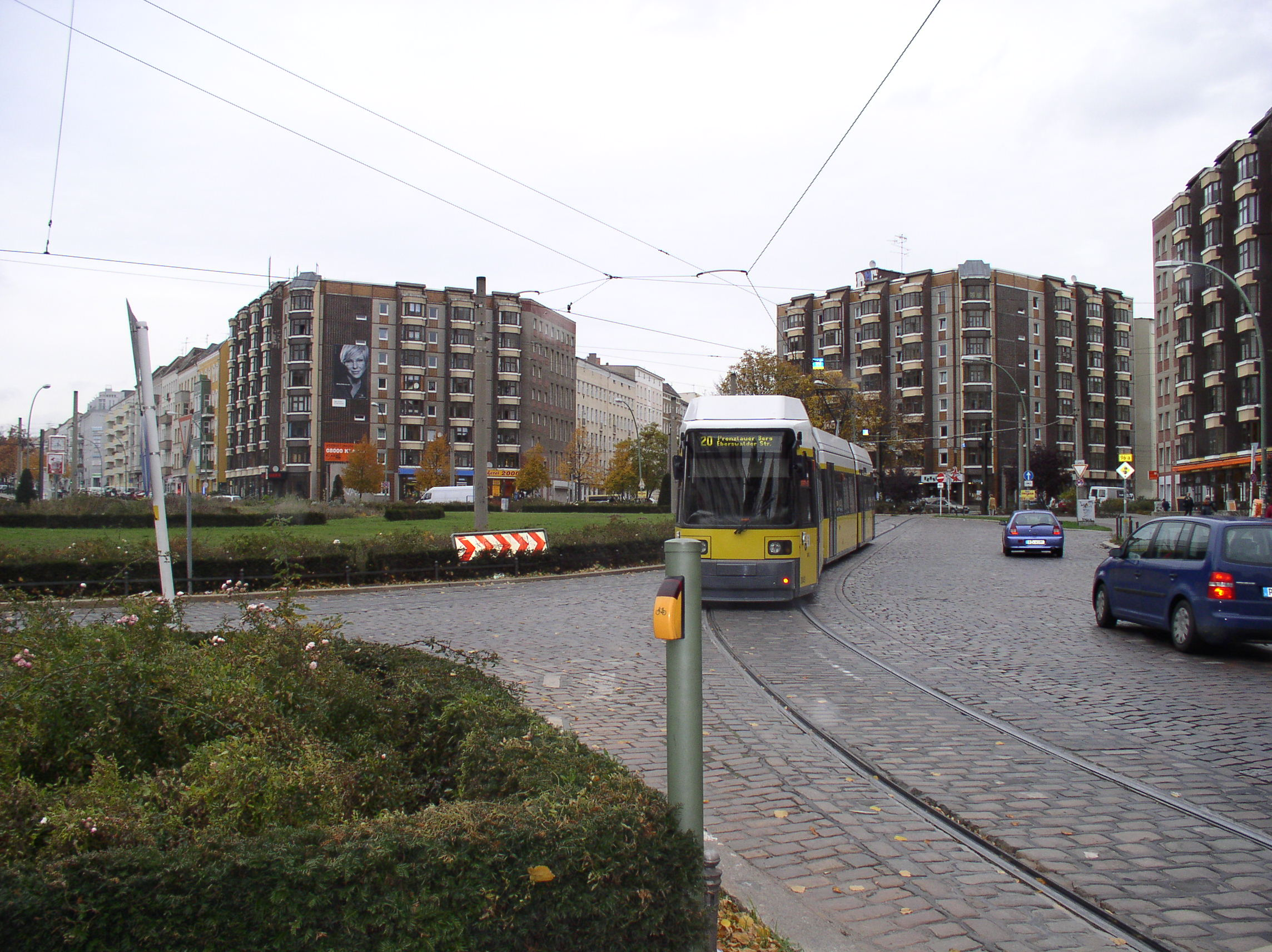

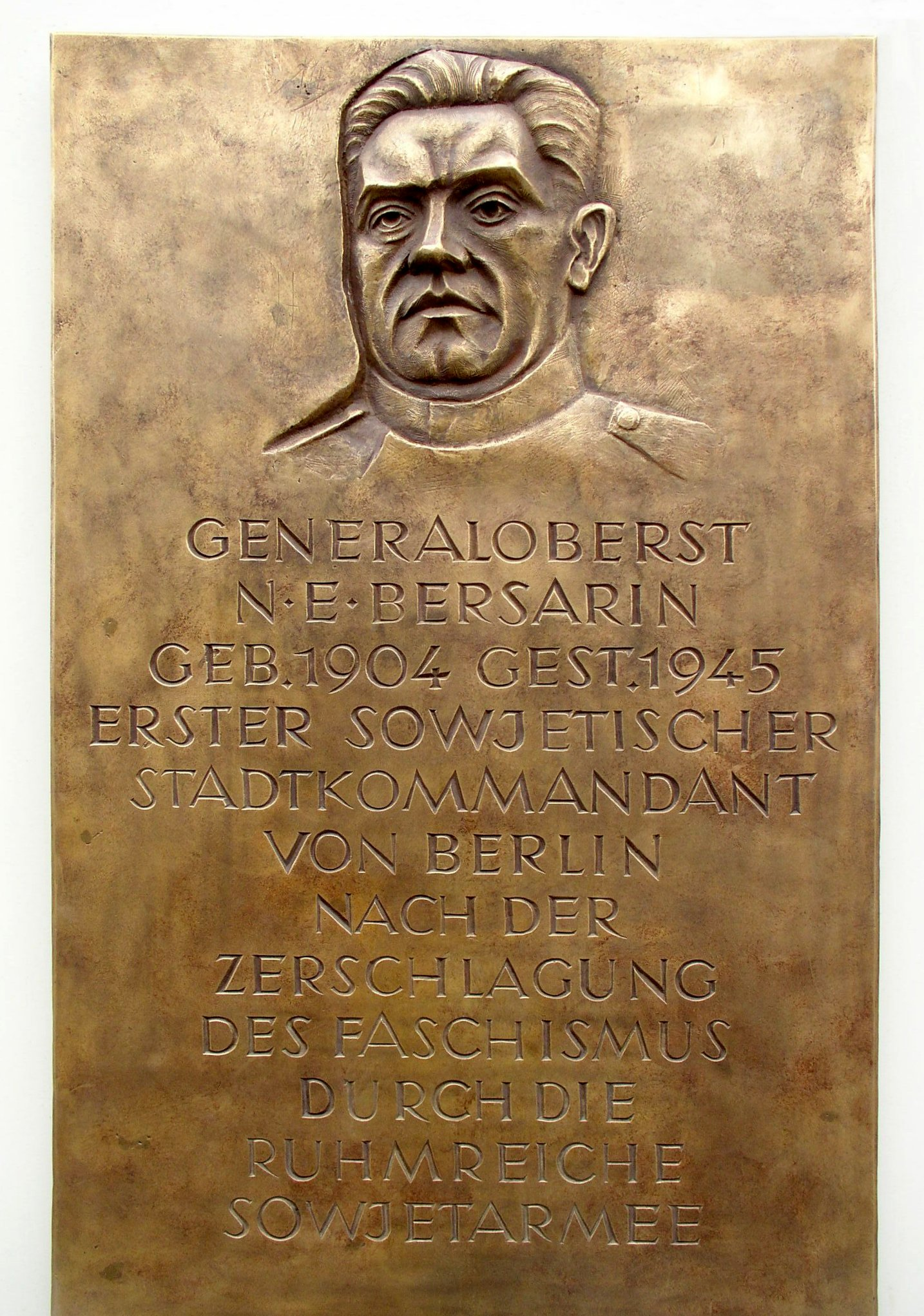

Bersarinplatz is a square in Friedrichshain, Berlin.

On 4 April 1895 the square was named Baltenplatz, after the Balts. However, on 31 July 1947, after World War II, the square was renamed Bersarinplatz after Nikolai Berzarin, the Russian Red Army General and former Commander of Berlin.

== History ==
In the 19th century, the area under consideration here did not yet belong entirely to Berlin but was located on the Berlin Feldmark, on the border between the municipality of Lichtenberg and the property of the city of Berlin, known as the Magistrat. In 1862, James Hobrecht developed the first development plan for the future expansion of Berlin. He gave the square on the eastern city boundary the working name Platz N in Division XIII, Section 2. This plan was revised again in 1882 and now took into account existing buildings on this site. These were, on the one hand, the bone mill and glue factory of Rentier Schulz and, on the other, a residential building belonging to J. G. Möses, who operated a Dutch windmill nearby on Lichtenberg land. The property of the bone mill was bought by the Actien-Gesellschaft für den Bau landwirtschaftlicher Maschinen und Geräthe für Wagenfabrikation, which had emerged from Heinrich Ferdinand Eckert's factory for agricultural machinery and iron foundry.

In 1925, Berlin city planners developed the idea of erecting a monument to the recently deceased Reich President Friedrich Ebert on the square. Due to political differences of opinion with the district officials, most of whom belonged to the KPD, this project was not realized.

Just two years later, however, another object by a sculptor was to dominate the square. Hugo Lederer had been commissioned to design a fertility fountain in 1927. The commissioned work was completed in 1932 and was given the names Ochsenbrunnen or Stierbrunnen because of its impressive figures. Lederer's inspiration for the motifs came from the nearby central cattle yard. This fountain and all its parts weighed around twelve tons. Now the construction experts realized that Baltenplatz was not suitable for the installation due to its construction method with its underground cast-iron gas, water and sewage pipes. And re-laying the piping system would have been far too expensive; the estimated cost was 120,000 Reichsmark. As a result, the completed colossal structure was finally moved to Arnswalder Platz in 1934, where it still stands today.

=== During the National Socialist era ===
In the time of National socialists, numerous people from the residential area around Baltenplatz were also taken away for deportation. As part of the "Stolpersteine" campaign, the fate of Gustav and Hermann Wegener (father and son), who lived in a house directly on Baltenplatz that no longer exists, was uncovered in the years after 1990. They were members of the Saefkow-Jacob-Bästlein organization. The district council had two stumbling stones placed on the west side of the square – Petersburger Street on the corner of Weidenweg – in their memory.

The air raids and battles at the end of the Second World War around Berlin's city center ultimately led to the almost destruction of the buildings on Baltenplatz. Reconstruction work from the autumn of 1945 onward resulted in the area being cleared of rubble and leveled. The residents then used every free patch of earth to improve their food supply, for example by growing vegetables. After the fatal accident of Soviet Colonel General and first city commander of Berlin Nikolai Erastowitsch Bersarin, the city administration renamed Baltenplatz to Bersarinplatz on 31 July 1947. At the same time, Petersburger Street was given the name Bersarin street.

In 1964, the Friedrichshain Town Hall was added as the first new building on the south-western corner of the square. This purely functional building served as the administrative headquarters of the former Friedrichshain district until reunification. A memorial plaque to Nikolai Bersarin, who was made an honorary citizen of Berlin that year, was placed next to the main entrance in 1975. The bronze plaque with a portrait of Bersarin was created by the sculptor Fritz-Georg Schulz.

Some years after the reunification of Germany, Around 1995, the renaming or renaming of Bersarinplatz was the subject of much controversy. However, unlike Bersarin street, which was renamed Petersburger street, the square kept its name.

The town hall was abandoned in the 1990s and the district administration moved to new premises at Samariter street subway station. After the merging of districts, the office building now houses the Citizens' Office 2, the registration office 62 and the social welfare office of the Friedrichshain-Kreuzberg district as well as the administration of the "Kindergarten City – Eigenbetrieb des Senats von Berlin".

In 2006, the buildings on the square were renovated and the facades were given thermal insulation and a uniform coat of paint. The plaster surfaces of the corner buildings on Bersarinplatz were decorated with colorful gecko silhouettes by the new owners. In front of the building on the north-western edge, a wall drawing refers to the marketing name Geckohaus, which the property owners gave to the renovated prefabricated building. All of the former commercial premises have been re-let. There are restaurants, an optician, a bank branch and other service providers around the square.

As the district lacked the funds to plant the square, it launched a fundraising campaign together with the Berliner Zeitung in 1995 to redesign the 4,000 m^{2} green space in the middle of Bersarinplatz, which also included the installation of small art objects. A lawn was created, which is bordered by yew hedges and rose bushes towards the street. The green area was enlarged to a diameter of between 60 and 85 meters by removing the footpath in front of the hedge. In 2006, landscape planner Marc-Rajan Köppler designed a 500 m^{2} gravel garden in the center of the square voluntarily with financial support from the district. Around 1800 low-maintenance plants such as summer lilacs, yarrow and asters, surrounded by a low yew hedge, delight passers-by together with 20 boulders on a gravel surface.
