= Walther Schreiber =

German politician

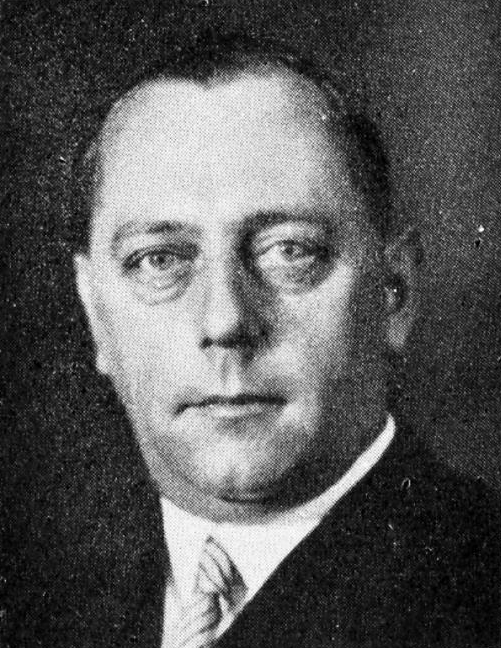
- Schreiber c. 1932

Governing Mayor of Berlin (West Berlin)
- In office 29 September 1953 – 11 January 1955
- President: Theodor Heuss
- Chancellor: Konrad Adenauer
- Preceded by: Ernst Reuter
- Succeeded by: Otto Suhr

Personal details
- Born: Walther Carl Rudolf Schreiber; 10 June 1884 Wipperdorf, Thuringia, Kingdom of Prussia, German Empire
- Died: 30 June 1958 (aged 74) West Berlin, West Germany
- Resting place: Waldfriedhof Zehlendorf
- Party: CDU
- Spouse(s): Margaret Rüffer; Ada Lewin-Traeger
- Children: Klaus-Dietrich Schreiber

Walther Carl Rudolf Schreiber (10 June 1884 — 30 June 1958) was a German politician who served as the mayor of West Berlin from 1953 to 1955, as a member of the Christian Democratic Union (CDU) Party.

Preceded by Ernst Reuter	Mayor of West Berlin; 1953–1955	Succeeded by Otto Suhr
