= Ludwig Steeg =

Nazi German Mayor of Berlin

Lord Mayor of Berlin
- In office July 1940 – 2 May 1945
- President: Himself; Joseph Goebbels
- Preceded by: Julius Lippert
- Succeeded by: Arthur Werner

Stadtpräsident of Berlin
- In office July 1940 – 7 April 1944
- Lord Mayor: Himself
- Preceded by: Julius Lippert
- Succeeded by: Joseph Goebbels

Personal details
- Born: 22 December 1894 Ottweiler, Rhine Province, Kingdom of Prussia, German Empire
- Died: 6 September 1945 (aged 50) Unknown
- Party: Nazi Party
- Occupation: Civil servant

Military service
- Allegiance: German Empire
- Branch/service: Imperial German Army
- Years of service: 1914–1918
- Rank: Oberleutnant
- Battles/wars: World War I
- Awards: Iron Cross, 1st and 2nd class

Ludwig Steeg (22 December 1894 – 6 September 1945) was a German Nazi politician who was the Oberbürgermeister (Lord Mayor) and Stadtpräsident (City President) of Berlin during the Third Reich.

== Early life ==
Steeg was born in Ottweiler near Saarbrücken, the son of a teacher. As a young man he moved to Berlin and gained a junior post in the city administration. In World War I he served in the infantry, attaining the rank of Oberleutnant of reserves and earning the Iron Cross, 1st and 2nd class. Returning to Berlin in 1919, he rejoined the administration and was, among other things, responsible for the city sanitation services and transport. He joined the Nazi Party in 1933 (membership number 1,485,884) and thus gained rapid promotion as the majority of Berlin's civil servants who were loyal to the Social Democrats were removed from office. He became deputy to Julius Lippert, the Staatskommissar (State Commissioner) of Berlin from 1933, and who became Oberbürgermeister and Stadtpräsident in January 1937.

== Oberbürgermeister and Stadtpräsident ==
The real power in Berlin under the Nazis was, however, the Party Gauleiter (Regional Leader), Joseph Goebbels, and in July 1940 he persuaded Adolf Hitler to dismiss Lippert, who he believed had become a rival to his authority. Steeg, a loyal nonentity, was appointed in his place, "for lack of anyone better," as Goebbels put it. Steeg was appointed acting Oberbürgermeister and Stadtpräsident. A member of the SS (SS number 127,531), he attained the rank of SS-Brigadeführer on 30 January 1943.

Steeg was responsible, under Goebbels, for the city's budget, traffic, building regulations, schools, youth facilities and health services. All these came under increasing strain as World War II went on, partly because of the inexperience of the Nazi loyalists who had been placed in responsible jobs following the removal of experienced but politically unreliable officials, and partly because of the increasing shortage of staff as a result of wartime conscription.

Steeg was also responsible for preparing Berlin for the air-raids which were widely expected. He prepared plans for the production and distribution of food, the construction of shelters and the evacuation of women and children. At the time of the first severe raid on 23–24 August 1943, Goebbels blamed Steeg for the poor performance of municipal authorities and threatened to dismiss him if matters failed to improve. The raids began to occur with increasingly frequency and severity. About a million people were evacuated; even so, between 1943 and 1945 approximately 50,000 Berliners were killed in air-raids. Steeg performed his tasks competently but did not exercise a public leadership role, which was undertaken by Goebbels.

== Removal as Stadtpräsident and death ==
By December 1943, Hitler wanted to settle the question of a permanent political leadership for Berlin and asked Goebbels to take on the job of Stadtpräsident while Steeg would be relegated to the more ceremonial post of Oberbürgermeister. Goebbels agreed to this as a means of obtaining more direct control over municipal authorities. On 7 April 1944, Goebbels took over direct administrative control of the city when he was formally named Stadtpräsident.

During the last months of the war, Steeg was made permanent Oberbürgermeister in February 1945 but was eclipsed by Goebbels in preparing the defences of Berlin against the approaching Red Army. He does not seem to have played any significant role in these events: he is not mentioned in any of the histories of Berlin at this time, such as Cornelius Ryan's The Last Battle or Anthony Reid and David Fisher's The Fall of Berlin. Nevertheless, his post as Oberbürgermeister made him the symbolic head of the capital of the German Reich. When the city surrendered to the Soviet forces on 2 May 1945, he was arrested and taken to a Soviet internment camp, where he died in unexplained circumstances in September.

== Sources ==
- Longerich, Peter (2015). Goebbels: A Biography. Vintage. ISBN 978-0-099-52369-7.
- "Hitler Names Goebbels 'President of Berlin'". The New York Times. 8 April 1944. p. 5.

Political offices
Preceded by Julius Lippert	Oberbürgermeister of Berlin; 1940–1945	Succeeded by Arthur Werner
Preceded by Julius Lippert	Stadtpräsident of Berlin; 1940–1944	Succeeded by Joseph Goebbels
