= Julius Lippert =

German Nazi politician (1895–1956)

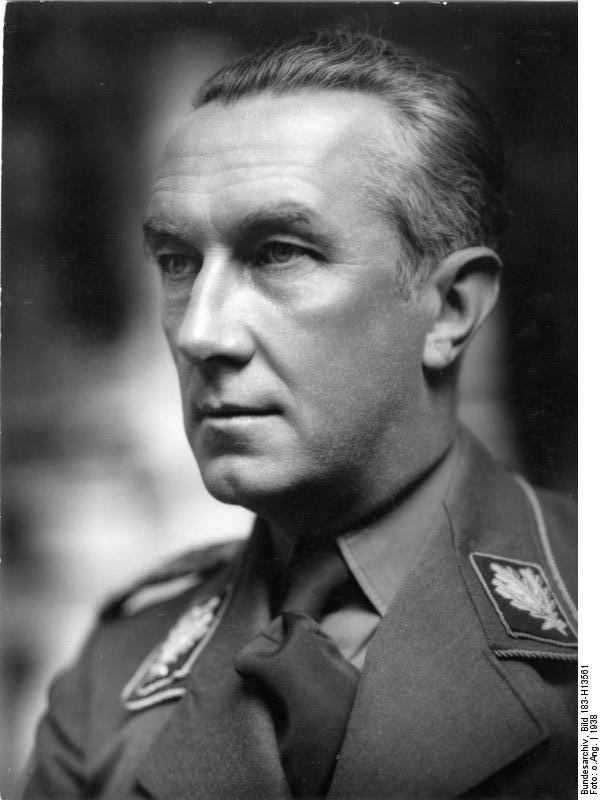
- Julius Lippert in 1938.

City President and Lord Mayor of Berlin
- In office 5 January 1937 – July 1940
- Preceded by: Oskar Maretzky (acting)
- Succeeded by: Ludwig Steeg (acting)

Staatskommissar of Berlin
- In office 14 March 1933 – 5 January 1937
- Preceded by: Position created
- Succeeded by: Himself

Personal details
- Born: 9 July 1895 Basel, Switzerland
- Died: 30 June 1956 (aged 60) Bad Schwalbach, Hesse, West Germany
- Party: Nazi Party
- Other political affiliations: German National People's Party; German Völkisch Freedom Party
- Education: Friedrich Wilhelm University
- Occupation: Journalist

Military service
- Allegiance: German Empire
- Branch/service: Imperial German Army
- Years of service: 1914–1918
- Rank: Leutnant
- Battles/wars: World War I

Julius Lippert (9 July 1895 – 30 June 1956) was a German Nazi Party politician who served as the Staatskommissar (State Commissioner) for Berlin from 1933 to 1937 and as its Oberbürgermeister and Stadtspräsident (City President) from 1937 to 1940.

== Early life ==
Born in Basel, Switzerland, Lippert became an extreme antisemite in his youth after reading works by antisemitic writers such as Joseph Arthur Comte de Gobineau and Houston Stewart Chamberlain. He was educated in the gymnasium in Wiesbaden and passed his abitur in 1914. He joined the Imperial German Army at the outbreak of the First World War, was wounded twice, and ended the war as a Leutnant of reserves in the artillery. Between 1918 and 1922 he studied political science and received his degree from the Friedrich Wilhelm University in Berlin. Lippert was a member of the Black Reichswehr, and then worked as a journalist and editor at several newspapers from 1923 to 1927. A member of the conservative German National People's Party from 1919 to 1921, he joined the even more extreme German Völkisch Freedom Party from 1921 to 1923.

== Nazi career ==
On 19 April 1927, Lippert enrolled in the Nazi Party (membership number 59,957) and became prominent due to his rabid antisemitism. He became a protégé of Joseph Goebbels, the Gauleiter of Berlin and became the editor-in-chief of Goebbels' paper, Der Angriff from June 1927 to January 1933. He was elected to the Berlin City Council in November 1929, becoming the deputy leader (1929–1933) and then the leader (1930–1933) of the Nazi faction on the council. In the 1932 Prussian state election, he failed in his bid to be elected to the Landtag of Prussia. However, shortly after the Nazi seizure of power, Lippert was appointed to the Landtag in March 1933 and was made the Staatskommissar (state commissioner) for Berlin on 14 March 1933. He purged the capital's government of opposition and was responsible for much of the early persecution of Jews in Berlin. In October 1933, he was made an inaugural member of Hans Frank's Academy for German Law. Also in October 1933, he entered the Nazi paramilitary organization, the SA, with the rank of SA-Standartenführer. He commanded the SA–Gruppe Berlin-Brandenburg from January 1934 and would eventually rise to the rank of SA-Gruppenführer. On 16 October 1934, he was made the president of the Prussian Provincial Council for Berlin. In October 1935, Goebbels commissioned him to begin preparatory work for the Berlin Olympic games, and in February 1936 he joined the Olympic Organizational Committee.

In December 1936, a new law combined Lippert's position, now titled Stadtspräsident (city president), with the office of Oberbürgermeister (lord mayor) of Berlin. Despite considerable doubts about Lippert's capabilities, Goebbels agreed to have him formally appointed to this post on 5 January 1937. He was also appointed to the Prussian State Council by Prussian Minister President Hermann Göring. Also in 1937, Lippert was named as a senator of the Kaiser Wilhelm Society. He was now at the height of his power.

However, by 1938 Goebbels was becoming increasingly dissatisfied with Lippert and, in August of that year, even contemplated appointing a special commissioner over him. He did not seek to remove Lippert, but continued to express his displeasure over the following months and his criticism increased. Goebbels referred to Lippert as "a real numbskull with the stature of a Mecklenburg village mayor". In May 1940, Goebbels issued "severe reproaches" to Lippert on "Berlin's disorganization", particularly regarding long lines outside shops which, he felt, marred the capital city's image by demonstrating war-related shortages. Finally Adolf Hitler, who had become increasingly hostile to Lippert, agreed to his removal in July 1940. Albert Speer recalled in his memoir how Lippert had incurred Hitler's displeasure years earlier by a lack of enthusiasm over the Führer's planned grandiose remodeling of Berlin, with Hitler expressing his frustrations by stating: “Lippert is an incompetent, an idiot, a failure, a zero.”

Lippert was succeeded by his deputy, Ludwig Steeg, and his departure from his prominent position led to rumors that he had been executed. However, he had actually joined the Wehrmacht, and from 1941 to 1943 was the commander of the "Southeast Propaganda Department" in Belgrade. He then was transferred to Belgium where he was the commandant of Arlon from May 1943 to August 1944. His next and last assignment was as the commander of a Feldjägerkorps regiment in Slovakia and Hungary.

== Post-war ==
In the closing days of the war, Lippert was captured in April 1945 and interned in Hamburg by British troops. He was extradited to Belgium in January 1946 for trial. He was sentenced to six years of hard labor on 29 June 1951, for involvement in war crimes. Although the sentence was increased to eight years in early 1952, he was released on 15 April 1952 on the basis of time served. Subsequently, on 1 September 1953, he was classified as a Nazi activist by a de-Nazification tribunal in Hesse. He was prohibited from holding political office or receiving a public pension. He lectured at universities until his death on 30 June 1956, in Bad Schwalbach.

== SA ranks ==
SA ranks
Date	Rank
1 October 1933	SS-Standartenführer
20 April 1935	SS-Oberführer
20 April 1936	SS-Brigadeführer
1 May 1937	SS-Gruppenführer

Political offices
Preceded by Oskar Maretzky (Lord Mayor)	City President and Lord Mayor of Berlin; 1937–1940	Succeeded by Ludwig Steeg
