= Arthur Werner =

Former mayor of Berlin

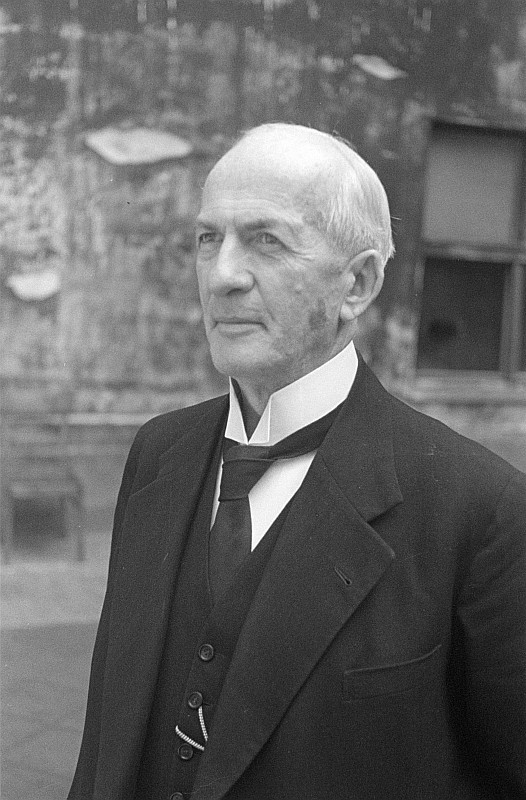
- Arthur Werner, 1946

Mayor of Berlin
- In office 19 May 1945 – 8 January 1947
- Preceded by: Ludwig Steeg (until 2 May 1945)
- Succeeded by: Otto Ostrowski

Personal details
- Born: 15 April 1877 Berlin, Kingdom of Prussia, German Empire
- Died: 27 July 1967 (aged 90) West Berlin
- Party: None
- Profession: Engineer

Arthur Victor Hugo Werner (15 April 1877, in Berlin – 27 July 1967) was the first Mayor of Berlin after World War II.

In 1907 Werner had graduated as an engineer at the Technical University of Charlottenburg. He ran a private technical college until March 1942 when Nazi authorities forced him to retire on account of what one source identifies as "bureaucratic chicanery". The private college closed and Werner retreated into private life till 1945. On 17 May 1945 he was appointed mayor by the Soviet administration of Berlin under Nikolai Berzarin: his appointment was confirmed by the western Allies after the division of the city into four sectors in July 1945. After the elections of 20 October 1946 Werner resigned in favour of Otto Ostrowski.

He was the oldest former Minister-President of Germany from gaining his office on 17 May 1945 until 28 February 1966 and was succeeded by Wilhelm Kaisen.
