= Heinrich Bertram =

American soldier

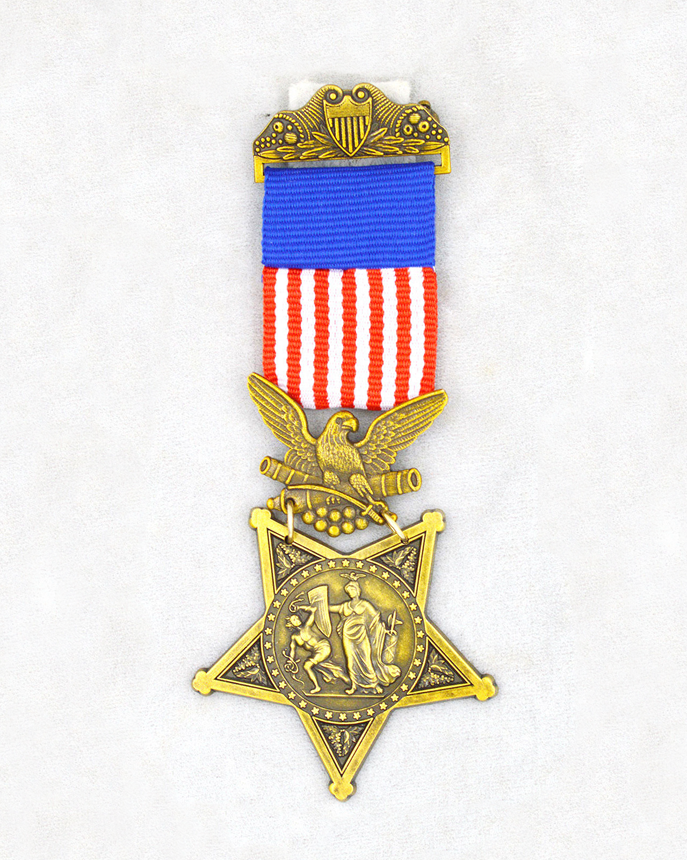
- Born: 1842; Brunswick, Germany
- Died: Unknown
- Military career
- Branch: United States Army
- Rank: Corporal
- Unit: 8th Cavalry Regiment
- Conflicts: Indian Wars
- Awards: Medal of Honor

Heinrich Bertram was a German-born United States Army soldier who received the U.S. military's highest decoration, the Medal of Honor. He served as a corporal in Company B, 8th U.S. Cavalry in the Arizona Territory during the American Indian Wars. Bertram served in Company B of the 8th U.S. Cavalry, and was awarded the Medal of Honor on July 24, 1869, for "bravery in scouts and actions against Indians."
