= Ferdinand Friedensburg =

German politician (1886–1972)

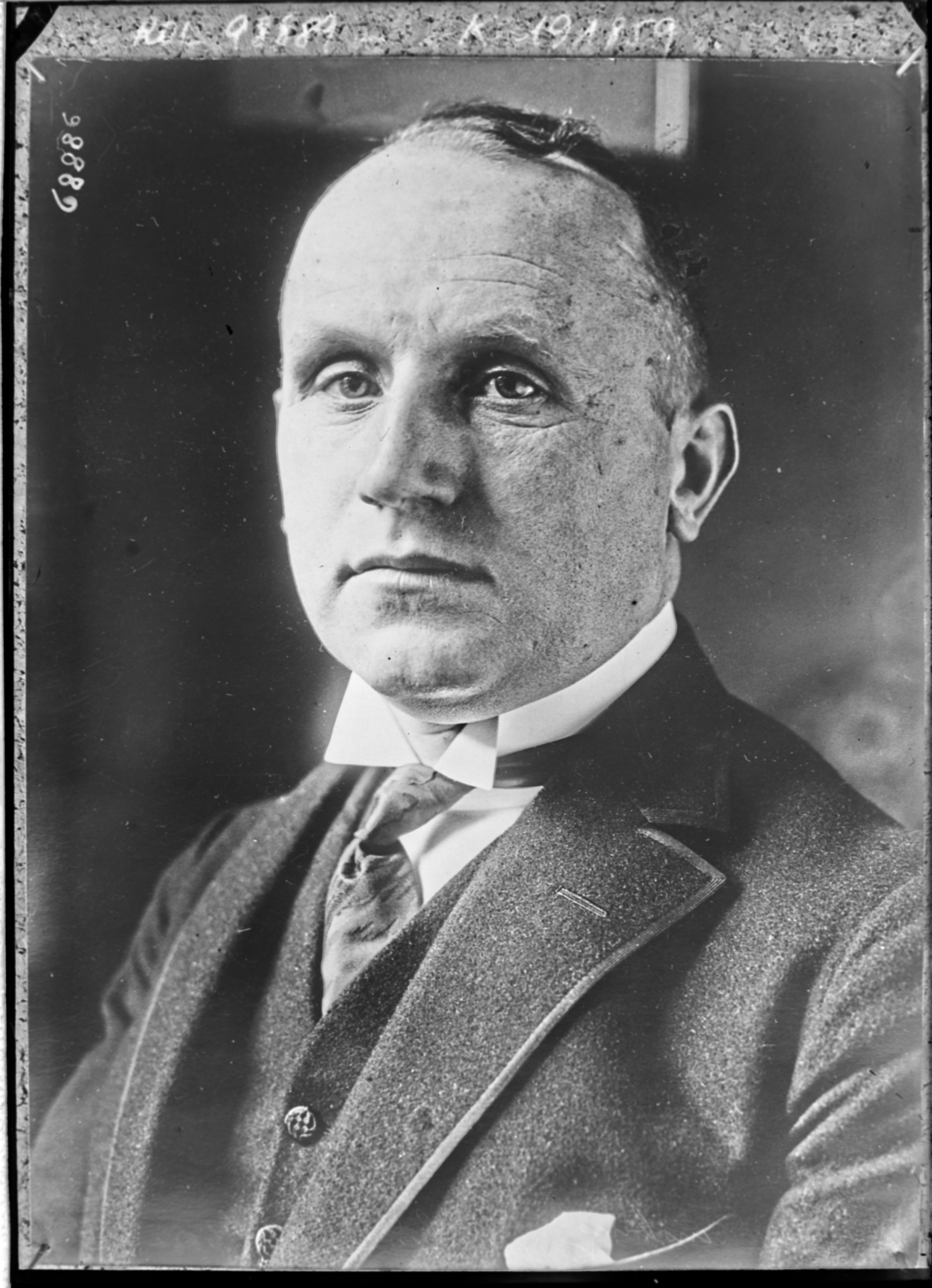

Mayor of Berlin (interim)
- In office 14 August 1948 – 1 December 1948
- Preceded by: Louise Schroeder
- Succeeded by: Louise Schroeder

Member of the Bundestag
- In office 1 February 1952 – 17 October 1965

Personal details
- Born: 17 November 1886 Schweidnitz, Province of Silesia, Kingdom of Prussia, German Empire
- Died: 11 March 1972 (aged 85) West Berlin
- Party: DDP; CDU

Ferdinand Friedensburg (17 November 1886 in Schweidnitz (present-day Świdnica) – 11 March 1972) was the interim Mayor of Berlin due to the illness of mayor Louise Schroeder during the Berlin Blockade in 1948.

== Biography ==
The son of a judge graduated in 1914 at the Berlin College of Mines (Bergakademie). Homebound from the United States at the outbreak of World War I, he was arrested by British Forces Gibraltar. On an attempt at flight Friedensburg was severely injured, resulting in a long-term stay in hospital. Not able-bodied for military service, he served at the German embassy in Bern until the end of the war.

Back to Berlin he joined the German Democratic Party (DDP) in 1920 and in 1921 became district administrator (Landrat) at Rosenberg, Marienwerder (today Susz, Poland). In 1925 Friedensburg was appointed vice president of the Berlin state police agency and in 1927 became region president of the Prussian Regierungsbezirk Kassel. As a supporter of the Weimar Coalition's Reichsbanner Schwarz-Rot-Gold paramilitary group his times in office were marked by fierce conflicts with the rising forces of the Communists and the Nazi Party. By September 1933 he was dismissed from state service.

In June 1945 Friedensburg was among the founders of the Christian Democratic Union in Berlin. After the elections of October 1946, he became a deputy mayor of the city council under Otto Ostrowski and remained in that office when Louise Schroeder succeeded Ostrowski on 8 May 1947.

Friedensburg continued to hold power in the Soviet occupation zone as chairman of the eastern sector of the CDU and the German Central Fuel Industry Administration. Although he had good relations with the Soviet Military Administration in Germany, he was despised by Walter Ulbricht and the ruling Socialist Unity Party of Germany (SED). When Ulbricht and Gustav Sobottka began plotting to oust him and accused him to the NKVD of maintaining contacts with former Nazis, he fled to West Berlin.

After the Soviet blockade of the western sectors had begun on 24 June 1948, Schroeder fell seriously ill and had to proceed to Hamburg for medical treatment. Friedensburg as her deputy from 14 August acted as mayor until, on 30 November, the Socialist Unity Party of Germany (SED) backed by the Soviet authorities proclaimed a separate city council of East Berlin under Friedrich Ebert Jr. and hindered Friedensburg from entering his office in Mitte. Though Schroeder officially reassumed office the next day, the elections called for 5 December could only be held in West Berlin and resulted in Ernst Reuter becoming mayor of West Berlin.

Friedensburg continued his political career as a member of the Bundestag (1952–1965) and of the European Parliament (1958–1965).
