= Ingrid Pankraz =

German politician

Lord Mayor of East Berlin
- In office 15 February 1990 – 23 February 1990
- Preceded by: Erhard Krack
- Succeeded by: Christian Hartenhauer

Personal details
- Born: Ingrid Windisch; 28 October 1948 Gommern, Saxony-Anhalt, Soviet occupation zone of Germany
- Party: PDS
- Education: Hochschule für Ökonomie Berlin-Karlshorst
- Occupation: Bureaucrat, politician

Ingrid Pankraz (born 28 October 1948) is a former East German bureaucrat and politician who briefly served as Lord Mayor of East Berlin in February 1990.

After receiving her doctorate in economics at the Hochschule für Ökonomie Berlin-Karlshorst in 1975, Pankraz began her career as a senior executive in the planning commission in East Berlin. In 1989 she was elected to the Magistrate of Berlin and was also confirmed as Deputy Mayor. Upon the resignation of her predecessor, Erhard Krack on 15 February 1990, Pankraz held the office of Lord Mayor for several days. She declined to run in the following election and was succeeded by Christian Hartenhauer.
