= Nikolai Berzarin =

Soviet military officer

Nikolai Erastovich Berzarin
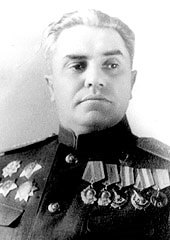
- Born: 1 April 1904; Saint Petersburg, Russian Empire
- Died: 16 June 1945 (aged 41); Berlin, Allied-occupied Germany
- Military career
- Allegiance: Soviet Union
- Branch: Red Army
- Service years: 1918–1945
- Rank: Colonel-general
- Commands: 27th Army; 34th Army; 39th Army; 5th Shock Army
- Conflicts: Russian Civil War; Battle of Lake Khasan; World War II
- Awards: Hero of the Soviet Union; Order of Lenin (2); Order of the Red Banner (2); Order of Suvorov

Nikolai Erastovich Berzarin (Russian: Никола́й Эра́стович Берза́рин; 1 April 1904 – 16 June 1945) was a Soviet military officer who held field army commands during World War II. A Hero of the Soviet Union, in 1945 he became the first commandant of the Soviet occupying forces in Berlin.

== Early life and Russian Civil War ==
Nikolai Erastovich Berzarin was born in Saint Petersburg on 1 April 1904, the son of Ernests Bērzzariņš (Ernst Berzzarin), a Latvian Putilov Factory lathe operator and a seamstress. He had one brother and three sisters. Although some authors describe Berzarin as being Latvian, he himself did not consider himself as such. In 1913 he began night courses at the city primary school, completing these in 1914 with the specialty of bookbinder. Berzarin worked as an unskilled laborer at the Saint Petersburg harbor. His father died in 1917, followed by his mother in 1918.

Berzarin joined the Red Army on 14 October 1918, beginning his service as a Red Army man in the 17th Petrograd Army Combat Sector. During the Russian Civil War he fought on the Northern Front against Allied troops in Arkhangelsk and in the suppression of the Kronstadt rebellion.

== Interwar period ==
Berzarin received command training at the 2nd Petrograd Infantry Command Courses and upon graduation in September 1923 was appointed a squad leader in the 5th Amur Rifle Regiment. Berzarin rose to command a platoon in the regimental school in March 1924, and fought in the destruction of Zazeyskoye uprising in Amur Oblast that year as assistant chief of a machine gun detachment. In 1925, he married bank employee Natalya Porosinyuk, with whom he had two daughters, Larissa and Irina. He graduated from machine gun courses at the Vystrel courses for command personnel in 1925 and became a member of the Communist Party in 1926. After graduating from the Command Courses of the Siberian Military District in October 1927, Berzarin commanded a platoon of the courses and in October 1928 became a class commander there.

Berzarin rose to command a training company at the Irkutsk Infantry School in April 1931. He served as responsible secretary of the party bureau of the Irkutsk Training Courses for Infantry Commanders from March 1932, and in July 1933 became assistant chief of the combat training department of the staff of the Special Red Banner Far Eastern Army. He became commander of the 77th Novgorod Rifle Regiment of the army's 26th Rifle Division in February 1935, receiving the rank of colonel when the rank was introduced in late 1935, and in August 1937 chief of the 2nd Department of the staff of the army's Primorsky Group of Forces. During the Great Purge in 1938, the NKVD tried to implicate Berzarin in the case of the executed commander Ivan Fedko but the case was closed due to lack of evidence. That year, his daughter Irina was born. In July, freshly appointed commander of the 32nd Rifle Division the previous month, Berzarin took part in the Battle of Lake Khasan. He was promoted to kombrig on 31 December 1938.

After Lake Khasan, Berzarin's career developed quickly: he was appointed commander of the 59th Rifle Corps in February 1939 and deputy commander of the 1st Red Banner Army of the Far Eastern Front in July 1940. Berzarin's rank was changed to major general when the Red Army introduced general officer ranks on 4 June 1940. In May 1941, he was appointed commander of the newly formed 27th Army, stationed at Riga in the Baltic Special Military District.

== World War II ==
After Germany invaded the Soviet Union, Berzarin commanded the army as part of the Northwestern Front in the Baltic strategic defensive operation, during which it defended the Baltic Sea coast. The army entered action in July and was forced to retreat to the lines of the Western Dvina, Velikaya, and Lovat rivers under the pressure of the German advance. The 27th Army counterattacked near Kholm in August and subsequently fought in defensive actions near Demyansk, stopping the German advance on the line of Lakes Velye and Seliger in early October. Berzarin was transferred to command the 34th Army of the front in December, leading it in the encirclement of German troops in the Demyansk Pocket during February 1942, but was unable to prevent the relief of the pocket in May. Berzarin was demoted to deputy commander of the 61st Army of the Bryansk Front in October, then served as deputy commander of the 20th Army from 4 January 1943. Berzarin distinguished himself in the fighting in the Battles of Rzhev and the Rzhev-Vyazma Offensive in March. During the latter, he was seriously wounded near Vyazma on 17 March and spent several months in the hospital. Berzarin was promoted to the rank of lieutenant general on 28 April.

Upon his recovery, Berzarin was returned to army command, taking over the 39th Army in September. He led the army as part of the 1st Baltic and 3rd Belorussian Fronts in the Smolensk operation and the winter offensive battles of 1943 and 1944 near Vitebsk.

Berzarin was transferred to command the 5th Shock Army of the 3rd Ukrainian Front on 27 May. The army was transferred north to the 1st Belorussian Front in October and Berzarin led it in the Vistula–Oder offensive that began in January 1945. For his command of the army in the offensive, Berzarin was made a Hero of the Soviet Union on 6 April. He was promoted to the rank of colonel general on 20 April.

=== Commander of Berlin ===
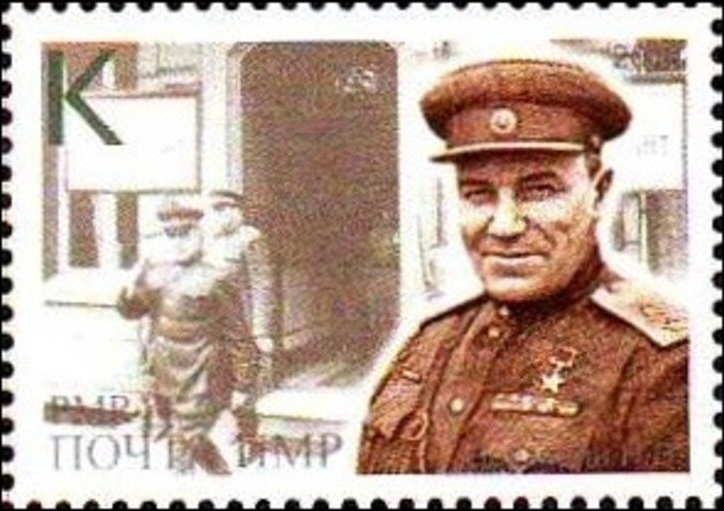
Berzarin on a 2019 stamp of Transnistria

During the Battle of Berlin, Berzarin's 5th Shock Army reached the eastern outskirts of Berlin on 21 April 1945, making them the first Soviet Army to do so. On 24 April, he was appointed commander of the city by Marshal Zhukov, in an echo of the Tsarist tradition of rewarding the first commander to enter a city with command over it. By his "Order No. 1" on 28 April, Berzarin assumed all governmental power. He worked to re-establish order in the ruined German capital, creating a city police force and supplying the population with food, water, gas, and electricity, as well as re-opening schools and theatres. On 17 May, he appointed non-partisan Arthur Werner the first post-war Mayor of Berlin presiding over a civil city government.

On 16 June 1945, after only 55 days in office, he was killed in a motorcycle accident when he collided with a truck convoy near his office in Berlin-Friedrichsfelde, aged 41. Berzarin is buried in the Novodevichy Cemetery in Moscow.

== Awards and honours ==
| Hero of the Soviet Union (6 April 1945) |
| Order of Lenin, twice (21 February 1945, 6 April 1945) |
| Order of the Red Banner, twice (25 October 1938, 3 November 1944, 2 September 1950) |
| Order of Suvorov, 1st class (29 May 1945) |
| Order of Suvorov, 2nd class (9 April 1943) |
| Order of Kutuzov, 1st class (22 September 1943) |
| Order of the Red Star (22 February 1941) |
| Medal "For the Defence of Moscow" (1 May 1944) |
| Medal "For the Liberation of Warsaw" (9 June 1945) |
| Medal "For the Capture of Berlin" (9 June 1945) |
| Medal "For the Victory over Germany in the Great Patriotic War 1941–1945" (9 May 1945) |
| Jubilee Medal "XX Years of the Workers' and Peasants' Red Army" (22 February 1938) |
| Legion of Honour, Commander (France) |

=== Honorary citizenship ===
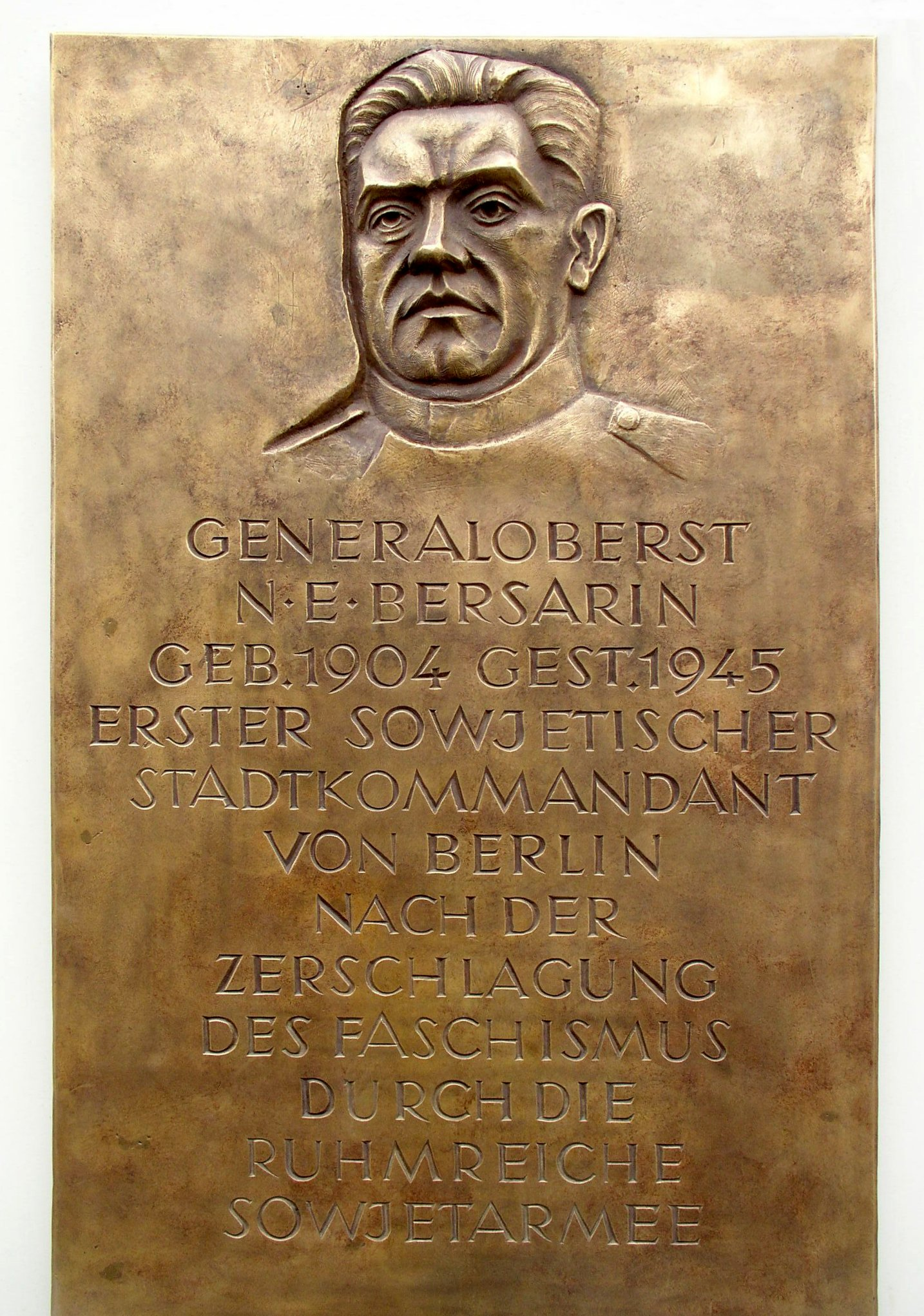
Memorial plaque at Bersarinplatz, Berlin-Friedrichshain

In 1975, Berzarin was posthumously bestowed honorary citizenship of East Berlin. After German reunification he was formally removed from the roll of honorary citizens by the Senate of Berlin in 1992.

Upon a resolution by the Berlin Abgeordnetenhaus parliament, he regained his honorary citizenship in 2003, in view of his merits concerning the supply of the local population. Detractors of the re-awarding claimed that Berzarin was a Stalinist and involved in Soviet war crimes being responsible for the deportation of 47,000 Balts in 1940. These accusations, however, were proven wrong later on, as Berzarin was deployed in Vladivostok at the questioned time.

From 1947 until 1991, Petersburger Straße in Berlin-Friedrichshain, a section of the Inner Ring Road, was named Bersarinstraße in his honour, the Bersarinplatz roundabout bears his name up to today. In April 2005, a road bridge in Berlin-Marzahn was named after Berzarin, in the area where his army reached the Berlin city limits in 1945. A birch tree planted in 2005 and a memorial stone mark the (presumed) site of his motorcycle accident.

== See also ==
- Battle in Berlin
