= Otto Suhr =

German politician (1894–1957)

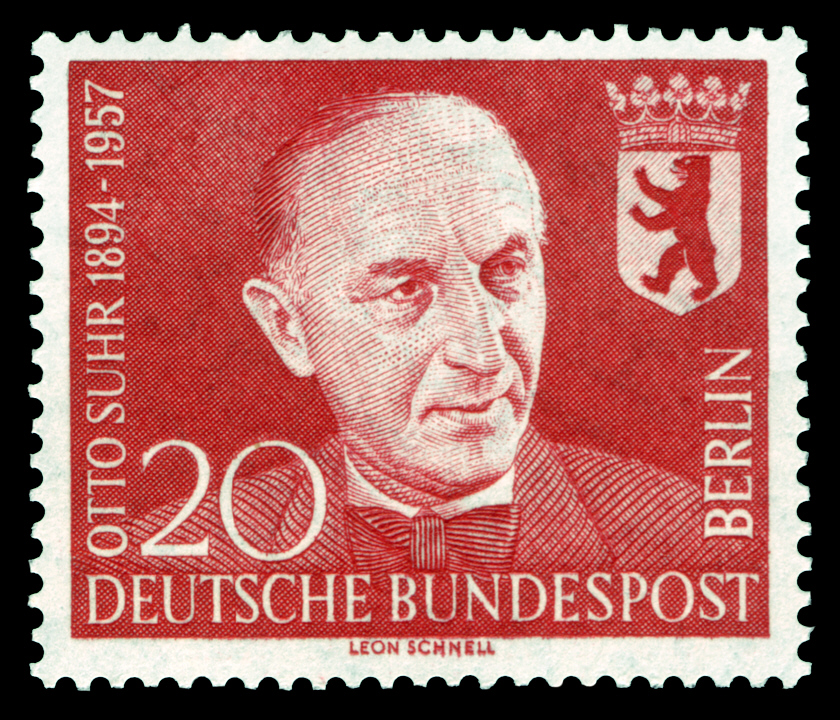
- Stamp of Suhr

Governing Mayor of Berlin (West Berlin)
- In office 11 January 1955 – 30 August 1957
- President: Theodor Heuss
- Chancellor: Konrad Adenauer
- Preceded by: Walther Schreiber
- Succeeded by: Willy Brandt

Personal details
- Born: 17 August 1894 Oldenburg, Duchy of Oldenburg, German Empire
- Died: 30 August 1957 (aged 63) West Berlin
- Party: Social Democrats

Otto Ernst Heinrich Hermann Suhr (17 August 1894 – 30 August 1957) was a German politician as a member of the Social Democratic Party of Germany (SPD). He served as the Governing Mayor of Berlin (i.e. West Berlin) from 1955 until his death.

== Life ==
He was born 1894 in Oldenburg and went with his family to Osnabrück when he was nine years old; four years later the family went to Leipzig, where Suhr studied economics, history and publishing science at the university, interrupted by his service in the German Army in World War I.

Suhr joined the SPD in 1919 and from 1922 worked as a secretary at the Allgemeiner Deutscher Gewerkschaftsbund trade unions' association in Kassel and was a member of the local SPD executive committee under Philipp Scheidemann. He received his doctorate in 1923 and from 1925 taught economics at the University of Jena. In 1926 he joined the board of the Allgemeiner freier Angestelltenbund (General Free Federation of Employees) in Berlin, which had to dissolve in the course of the Nazi seizure of power in 1933 and the succeeding Gleichschaltung process.

From 1935 on, Suhr worked as a journalist at the Frankfurter Zeitung and other newspapers. He remained in contact with Social Democratic members of the German resistance like Adolf Grimme and had to face several interrogations by the Gestapo.

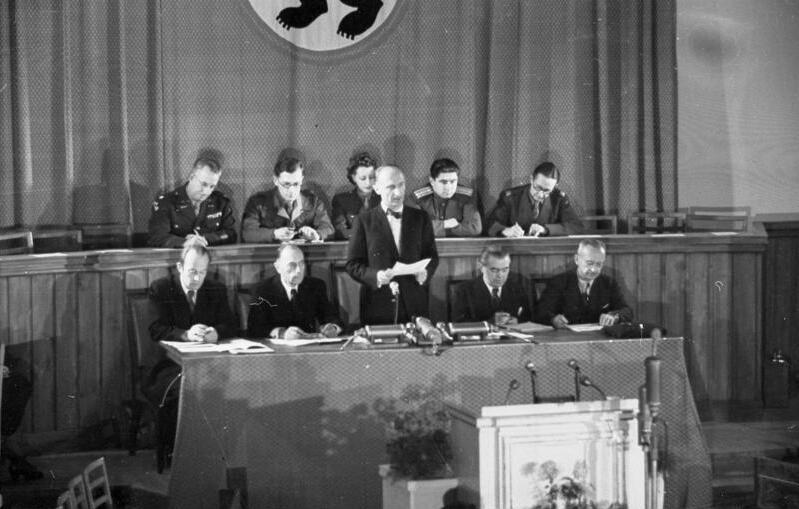
Inaugural speech of Otto Suhr to the Berlin city assembly, 1946

After World War II he played a vital role in re-organizing the Berlin SPD chapter as chairman of the party's state association. From 1946 Suhr was president of the Berlin Stadtverordnetenversammlung city assembly, and from 1951 until 1954 also of its successor, the Abgeordnetenhaus of Berlin. He had to cope with the forceful SED merger of Social Democrats and Communists in the Soviet occupation zone and East Berlin, the Berlin Blockade and the final division of the city, when the assembly was compelled to move into the Rathaus Schöneberg in the American sector.

In 1948/49 Suhr was a deputy at the Herrenchiemsee convention and the Parlamentarischer Rat (parliamentary council) to draft a new German constitution. After ratification of the Basic Law (Grundgesetz) in 1949 he was elected as a deputy to the Bundestag federal parliament of West Germany in Bonn, until he resigned his seat in 1952. Suhr lectured as an honorary professor at the Free University of Berlin (FU) and re-established the private Deutsche Hochschule für Politik academy, the biggest and one of the most important institute for political science in Germany, which he led from 1948 to 1955. In 1958 it was integrated into the FU and named Otto-Suhr-Institut in his honour.

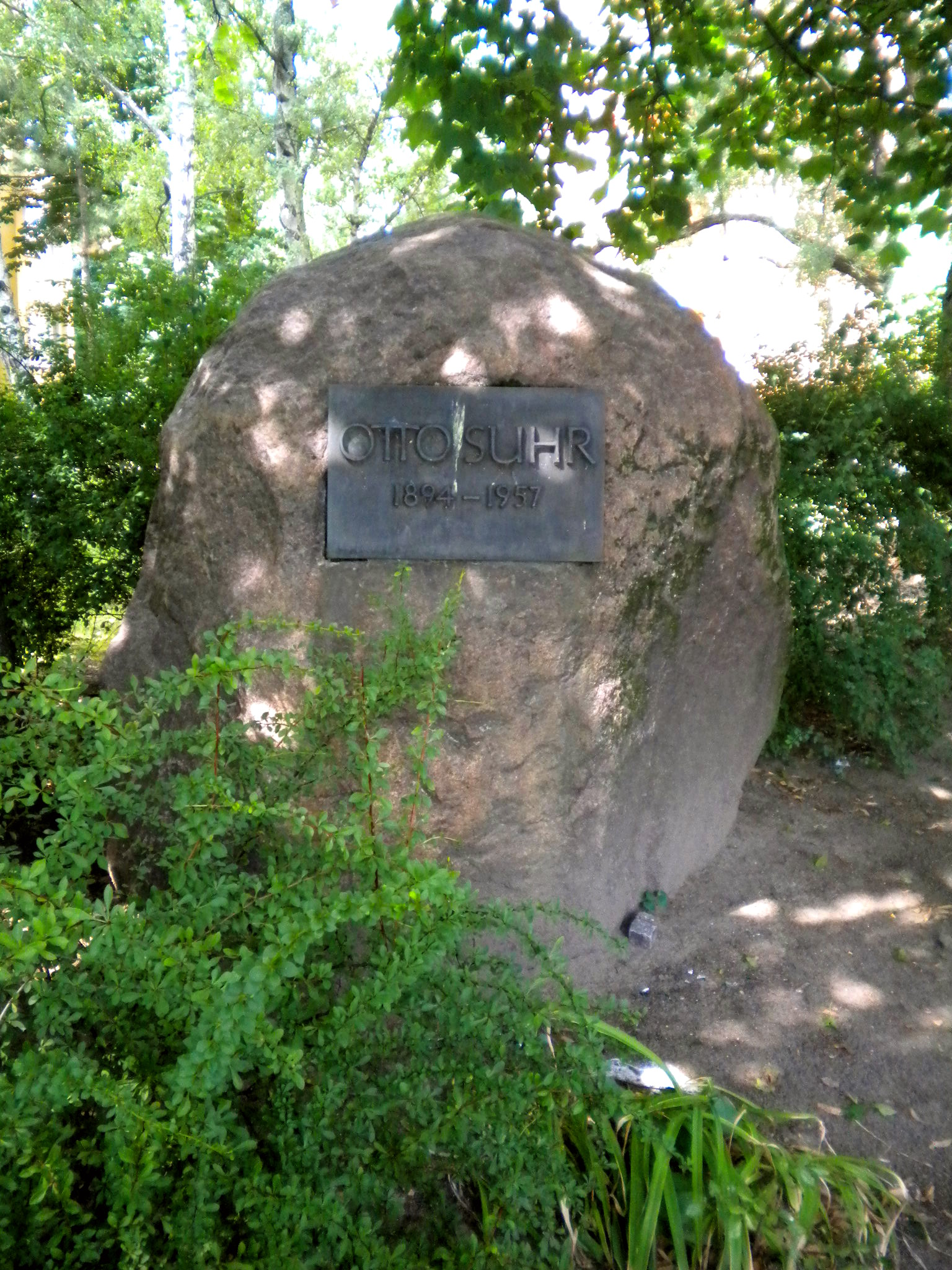
Otto Suhr's Memorial Stone in Berlin

In the West Berlin election of December 1954, the coalition government of Christian Democrats (CDU) and Free Democrats (FDP) under Governing Mayor Walther Schreiber lost its plurality, with the SPD reaching a one-seat absolute majority in the Abgeordnetenhaus assembly. Suhr nevertheless decided to form a coalition with the CDU and was elected Regierender Bürgermeister on 11 January 1955. His incumbency was driven by the efforts to rebuild the city, marked by the 1957 Interbau exhibition. On 19 July 1957 Suhr also asserted his regular appointment as President of the Bundesrat despite Allied reservations, however he did not step into office as he died from leukemia six weeks later and was succeeded by Willy Brandt.

== Honours ==
Beside the Otto-Suhr-Institut, a street in his birthplace Oldenburg (in the district Eversten) and Otto-Suhr-Allee in the Berlin district of Charlottenburg are named after him.

Preceded by Walther Schreiber	Mayor of West Berlin; 1955–1957	Succeeded by Willy Brandt
Preceded by -	President of the Abgeordnetenhaus of West Berlin; 1951–1955	Succeeded by Willy Brandt
