= Otto Ostrowski =

German politician (1883–1963)

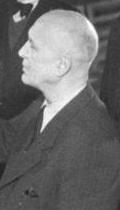

Mayor of Berlin
- In office 8 January 1947 – 18 April 1947
- Preceded by: Arthur Werner
- Succeeded by: Louise Schroeder

Personal details
- Born: 28 January 1883 Spremberg, Province of Brandenburg, Kingdom of Prussia, German Empire
- Died: 16 June 1963 (aged 80) Knokke, Belgium
- Party: SPD

Otto Ostrowski (28 January 1883 in Spremberg – 16 June 1963 in Knokke, Belgium) was a German politician of the Social Democratic Party of Germany (SPD) and Mayor of Berlin in 1946–1947.

Ostrowski graduated in Romance studies and after World War I joined the SPD. From 1922 he served as mayor of Finsterwalde until he was elected mayor of the Berlin borough of Prenzlauer Berg in 1926. He held this office up to the Nazi seizure of power in 1933, when he was forced to resign. A fierce opponent of the Nazis, he helped hiding Jewish persecutees to protect them from deportation to the extermination camps. After World War II he was appointed mayor of Berlin-Wilmersdorf in 1946.

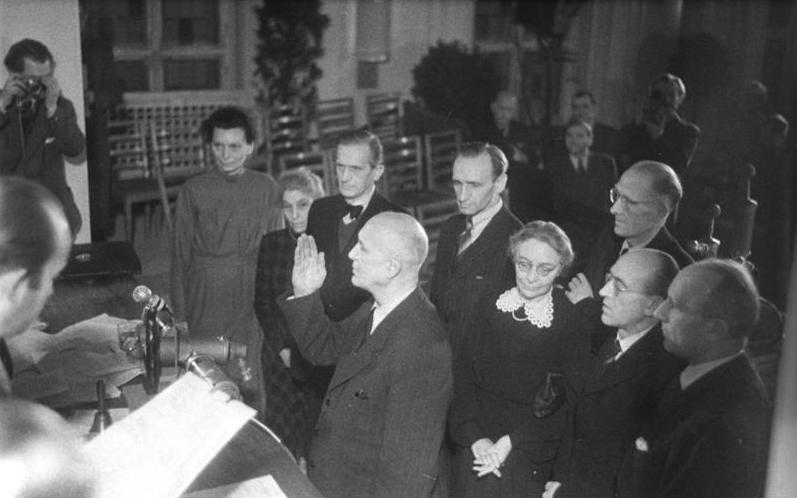
Ostrowski takes the oath of office on 26 November 1946, to the right deputy mayors Louise Schroeder and Ferdinand Friedensburg

In the elections of 20 October 1946 the SPD had reached a 48.7% share of votes and the new city parliament of Berlin (predecessor of the present-day Abgeordnetenhaus) elected Ostrowski for mayor on 5 December 1946. He stepped into office on 8 January 1947, but from the beginning had to deal with the uncertain relationship to the deputies of the Socialist Unity Party of Germany (SED). The party had been formed on 21 April 1946 by the merger of the SPD in the Soviet occupation zone with the Communist Party of Germany (KPD), strongly backed by the Soviet authorities. Though the SPD in the western sectors – including Ostrowski himself – refused this union, he appointed SED members for the city council against strong resistance in his party and was finally voted out of office on 11 April 1947.
