= Heinrich Wilhelm Krausnick =

German politician (1797–1882)

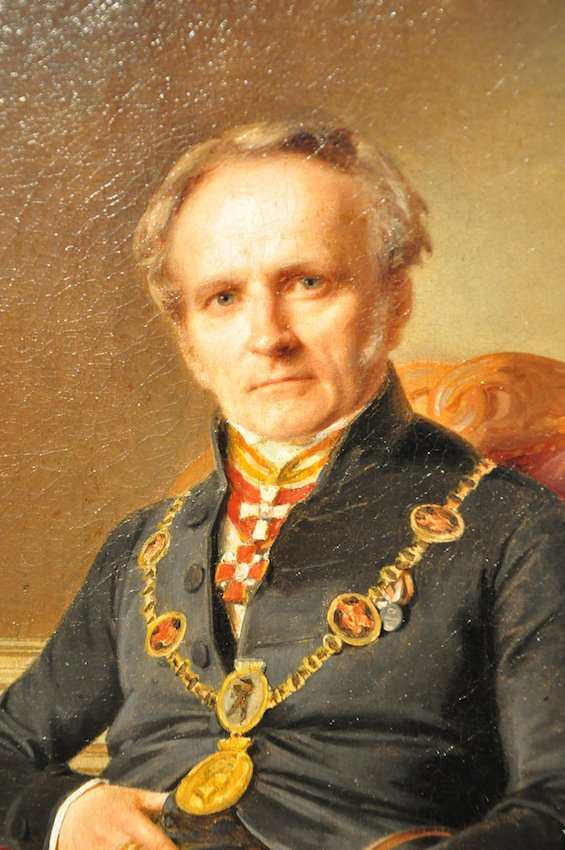

Mayor of Berlin
- In office 1843–1848, 1850–1862

Personal details
- Born: 30 March 1797 Potsdam, Germany
- Died: 14 December 1882 (aged 85) Berlin, Germany
- Resting place: Kirchhof Jerusalem und Neue Kirche II, Kreuzberg, Friedrichshain-Kreuzberg, Berlin, Germany
- Spouse: Henriette Louise Sauer

Heinrich Wilhelm Krausnick (1797 – 1882) was a German lawyer and Lord Mayor of Berlin in two terms from 1834 until 1848, and again in 1850 until 1862.

Krausnickstraße (Krausnick Street) and Krausnick Park in Mitte, Berlin are named in his honor.

== Biography ==
Krausnick was born on 30 March 1797 in Potsdam, Germany into a Protestant family, and he was the son of a master tailor. He attended high school in Potsdam and continued to college in 1816 at Berlin University where he studied law. He was married to Henriette Louise née Sauer (1797–1851) and they had children Georg Friedrich Wilhelm Krausnick (1828–1878) and Johanna Budczies née Krausnick (1830–1889).

In 1822, Krausnick was appointed City Justice Council in Berlin.

Krausnick was elected Lord Mayor of Berlin in 1834 as the successor to Friedrich von Bärensprung. He served in this role for fourteen years, and was voted out of office on 31 March 1848 as part of the German revolutions of 1848–1849. In 1850, after the victory of the reaction, he became mayor for another 12 years and resigned from office in 1862.

During his tenure, the areas of Moabit, Wedding, the Schöneberger Vorstadt and the Tempelhofer Vorstadt were incorporated into Berlin.

In 1865, Krausnick co-founded the Society for the History of Berlin together with Julius Beer and Ferdinand Meyer.

== Death and legacy ==
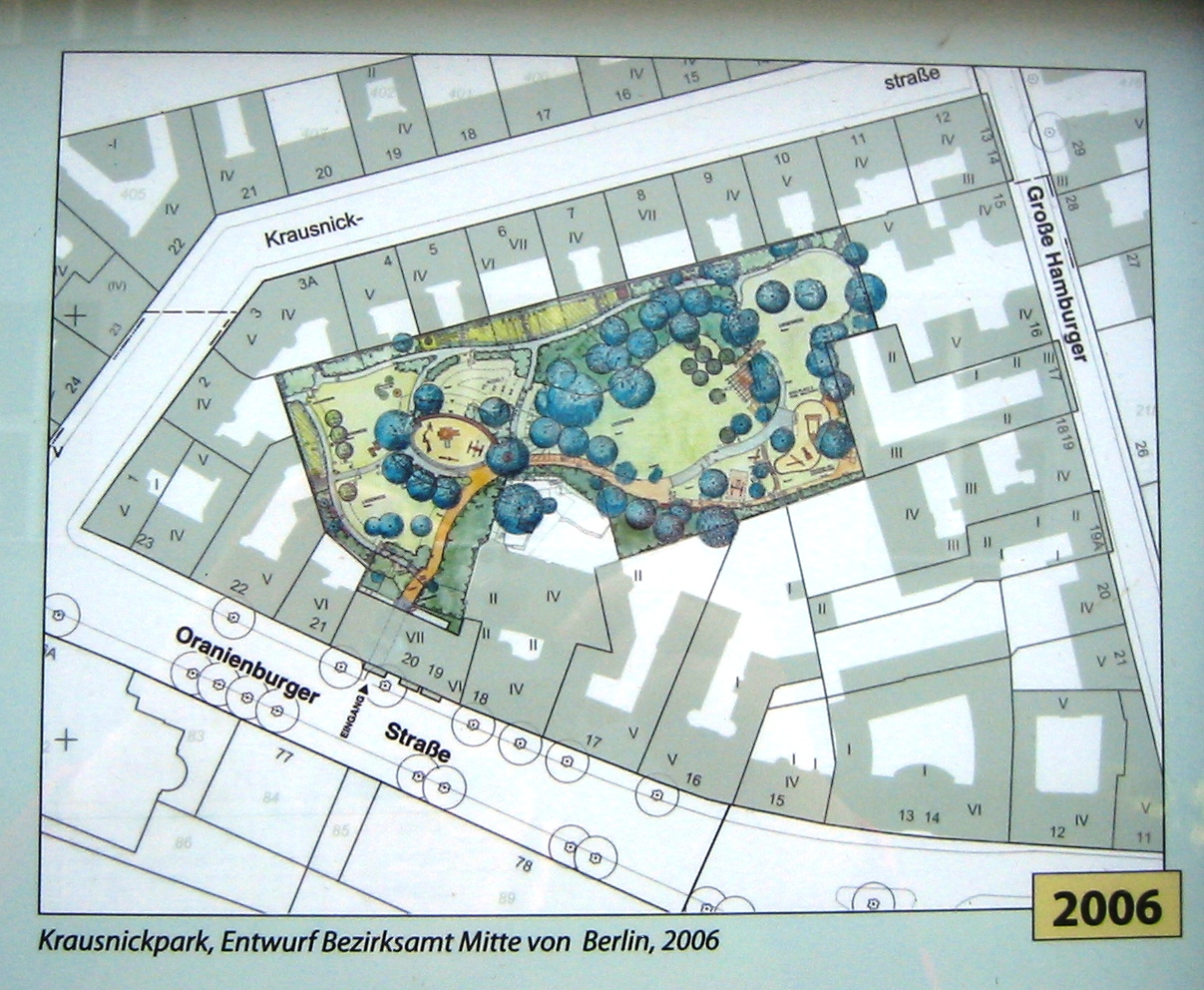
His namesake Krausnick Park in Spandauer Vorstadt, this image of the drafting of the park remodel in 2006

On 7 October 1861 a street in the Spandauer Vorstadt area of Mitte in Berlin was named after him in honor, Krausnickstraße. Nearby Krausnick Park, an inner block park between Krausnickstraße, Oranienburger Straße and Große Hamburger Straße has history that goes back to the 18th century and was recently renovated from 2004 until 2007.

Heinrich Wilhelm Krausnick died on 14 December 1882 at the age of 85 in Berlin. He is buried in Kirchhof Jerusalem und Neue Kirche II (translates to Jerusalem Cemetery and New Church II) in the Kreuzberg neighborhood of Berlin. After his death, Krausnick was made an honorary citizen of Berlin on 30 December 1862.
