= Ernst Reuter =

German mayor of West Berlin (1889–1953)

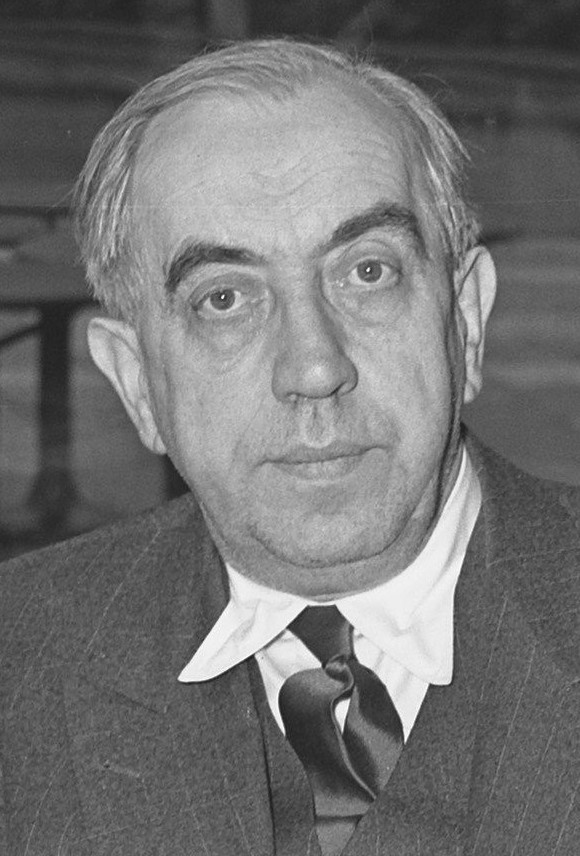
- Reuter in 1951

Governing Mayor of Berlin (West Berlin)
- In office 1 February 1951 – 29 September 1953
- President: Theodor Heuss
- Chancellor: Konrad Adenauer
- Preceded by: Himself (as Lord Mayor of Greater Berlin)
- Succeeded by: Walther Schreiber

Lord Mayor of Greater Berlin (West Berlin only)
- In office 24 June 1947 – 1 February 1951
- Preceded by: Otto Ostrowski; Louise Schroeder (acting)
- Succeeded by: Himself (as Governing Mayor of Berlin)

Member of the Reichstag for Magdeburg
- In office 31 July 1932 – 22 June 1933
- Preceded by: Multi-member district
- Succeeded by: Constituency abolished

Chairman of the Volga German Autonomous Soviet Socialist Republic
- In office October 1918 – March 1919
- Preceded by: Office established
- Succeeded by: Adam Reichert

Personal details
- Born: Ernst Rudolf Johannes Reuter; 29 July 1889 Apenrade, Province of Schleswig-Holstein, Kingdom of Prussia, German Empire (present-day Aabenraa, Denmark)
- Died: 29 September 1953 (aged 64) West Berlin, West Germany (present-day Berlin, Germany)
- Resting place: Waldfriedhof Zehlendorf, Berlin
- Party: RSDRP(b) (1917–1919); KPD (1921–1922); USPD (1922); SPD (1922–1953)
- Spouse: Hanna Kleinert
- Children: Edzard Reuter
- Education: Philipps-Universität Marburg
- Central institution membership: 1920–1921: Member, KPD Central Commission; 1920: Candidate member, KPD Zentrale

Ernst Rudolf Johannes Reuter (29 July 1889 – 29 September 1953) was a German politician who was the mayor of West Berlin from 1948 to 1953, during the Cold War. He played a significant role in unifying the divided sectors of Berlin and publicly and politically took a stand against the Soviet Union.

== Early years ==
Reuter was born in Apenrade (Aabenraa), Province of Schleswig-Holstein (now in Denmark). He spent his childhood days in Leer where a public square is named after him. Reuter attended the universities of Münster and Marburg where he completed his studies in 1912 and passed the examinations as a teacher. Moreover, he was member in a fraternity called "SBV Frankonia Marburg". The same year he became a member of the Social Democratic Party of Germany (SPD).

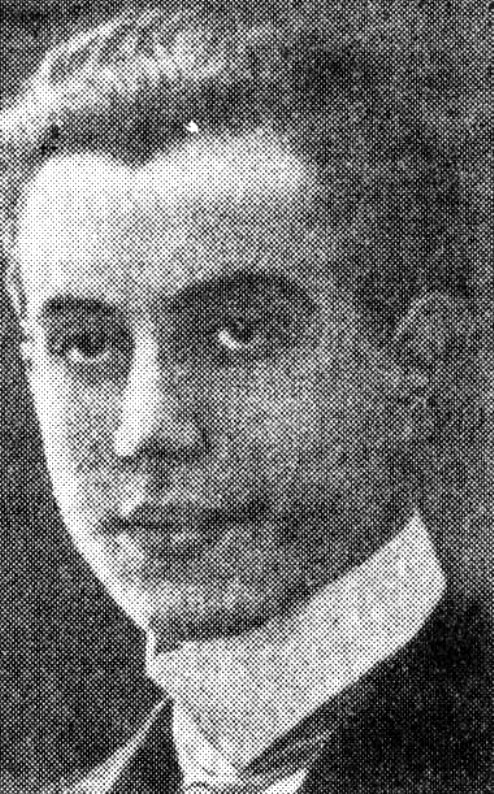
Reuter in 1918

Reuter opposed Kaiser Wilhelm II's regime at the start of the First World War. After being drafted, Reuter was sent to the Eastern front where he was wounded and captured by the Russians. During the 1917 October Revolution Reuter joined the Bolsheviks and organized his fellow prisoners into a soviet. After his release, Lenin sent him to Saratov as a People's Commissar. Here he became involved with the Volga Commissariat for German Affairs, and served as the first Chairman of the Volga German Autonomous Soviet Socialist Republic from 1918 to 1919.

== Weimar Republic ==
Upon his return to Germany, Reuter joined the Communist Party of Germany (KPD) and was named the First Secretary of its Berlin section. He embraced a position on the left wing of the party endorsing an open rebellion in March 1921 in central Germany and placed himself hereby in opposition to the leader of the party, Paul Levi. Although Reuter was seen as a favorite of Lenin, he was expelled from the party in 1922. He moved briefly to the Independent Social Democratic Party of Germany (USPD), and then returned to the Social Democrats for good.

In 1926, Reuter entered services in the government of Berlin and was responsible for transportation. Accomplishments were the foundation of the Berliner Verkehrsbetriebe (BVG), the introduction of a unified ticket for public transportation, and extensions of the Berlin subway system.

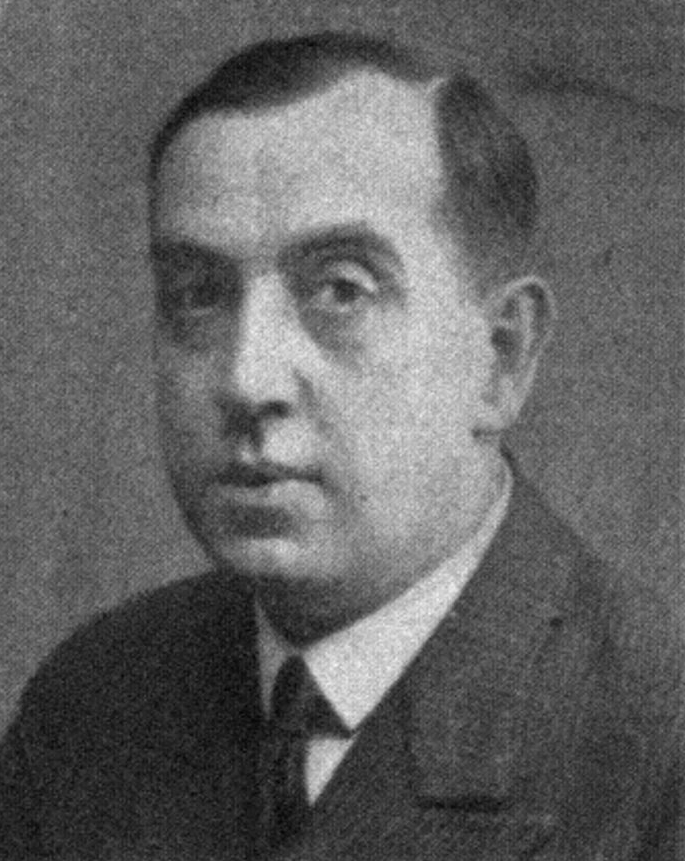
Reuter's official Reichstag portrait, 1932

From 1931 until 1933, Reuter was the mayor of Magdeburg where he fought lack of housing and jobs due to the economic crisis. He also was elected as a member of the Reichstag. In 1933, with the Nazis now in power, he was forced to resign his positions and was brought to the concentration camp (KZ) Lichtenburg near Torgau. He was released through the English efforts at the University of Cambridge, where he would go into exile, before continuing on to Turkey in 1935 where he stayed until the end of the Nazi era. In Ankara he lectured at the University of Ankara, introduced urban planning as a university discipline, and served as consultant to the Government.

=== Post-war Berlin ===
After the end of World War II, Reuter returned to Berlin, and was elected in 1946 to the Magistrat (governing body) where he oversaw initially the Transportation Department. In 1947 he was elected Lord Mayor (Oberbürgermeister) of Berlin but in the deepening crisis of the Cold War, the Soviet government withheld their necessary consent.

The four sectors of Berlin, 1948

Reuter is most notable for his stance during the Cold War in Berlin. During the Soviet-imposed Berlin Blockade (1948/49), the western part of city was sustained by the Berlin airlift that was established by the American Military Governor, Lucius D. Clay. In response to the threat, the citizens in the western sectors had to come together. Ernst Reuter became their spokesman and leader, a symbolic figure of the Free Berlin. Reuter's speech in front of the burned-out Reichstag building on 9 September 1948 received wide acclaim, where he faced a crowd of 300,000 and appealed to the world not to abandon Berlin. In the election that was conducted in the western part of Berlin two months later, his popularity gave the SPD the highest win ever achieved by any party in a free election in Germany, with 64.5% of the vote. As mayor he formed a grand coalition government with the next two largest parties to demonstrate West Berlin's unity. Reuter's appeal to the West did not go unheard. The airlift saved the city from starvation, and Reuter became only the second German postwar politician (after Konrad Adenauer) to be placed on the cover of Time magazine. He was titled "Herr Berlin".

When the new state constitution became effective for the western sectors of Berlin, Reuter was re-elected and on 18 January 1951 and became what was now called the Governing Mayor (Regierender Bürgermeister) of West Berlin. He served in this function until his death.

Under his aegis, the Free University of Berlin was founded, as the University of Berlin was in the Soviet sector and under communist rule. In 1953 Reuter established the "Bürgermeister-Reuter-Stiftung" (Mayor Reuter Foundation) to assist refugees coming to West-Berlin.

A few months after the uprising of 17 June 1953 in East Berlin, Reuter died from a sudden heart attack in West Berlin. He was 64 years old. His funeral was attended by more than 1 million people and he was honored with an Ehrengrab (honorary grave) in the Waldfriedhof Zehlendorf.

=== Quote ===
- "Ihr Völker der Welt ... Schaut auf diese Stadt und erkennt, dass ihr diese Stadt und dieses Volk nicht preisgeben dürft, nicht preisgeben könnt!" (People of this world... look upon this city and see that you should not, cannot abandon this city and this people) —Reuter's speech from 9 September 1948 (German)

== Family ==
Reuter was a younger half brother of Otto Sigfrid Reuter, a völkisch-religious ideologue. Reuter was married in 1920, and he and his wife Lotte (Charlotte) had two children, Hella (1920–1983), and (Gerd Edzard) Harry (1921–1992). Harry was adopted by Margareta Burkill and her family in Cambridge. Harry became a British citizen and a professor of mathematics. Harry's son Timothy was a distinguished mediaeval historian. In 1927 Reuter divorced Charlotte and remarried. He and his second wife Hanna had one son, Edzard (1928–2024), who became the CEO of Daimler-Benz.

== Honors ==
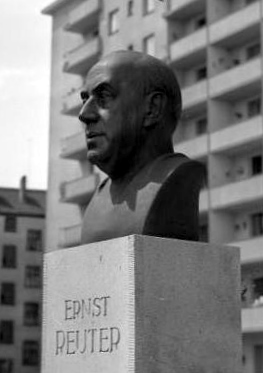
Bust of Reuter in Berlin-Gesundbrunnen (by Harald Haacke)

- Ernst-Reuter-Plakette (Ernst Reuter Medal): the highest award by the City of Berlin was established by the Senate of Berlin for persons whose work benefited the city in 1954.
- Ernst-Reuter-Gesellschaft (Ernst Reuter Association): a group of alumni and friends of the Free University of Berlin that was founded in 1954. The Association names the winners of the annual "Ernst-Reuter-Preis" for excellent dissertations from the university and provideds "Ernst-Reuter-Stipends" for studies abroad.
- Former places where Reuter lived received memorial plaques: Hardenbergstraße 35 (Berlin-Charlottenburg), and Bülowstraße 33 (Berlin-Zehlendorf).
- Among the many places in Berlin that commemorate Reuter are:
  - a major public square and subway station Ernst-Reuter-Platz (Berlin U-Bahn),
  - a government building
  - a school
  - a youth hostel

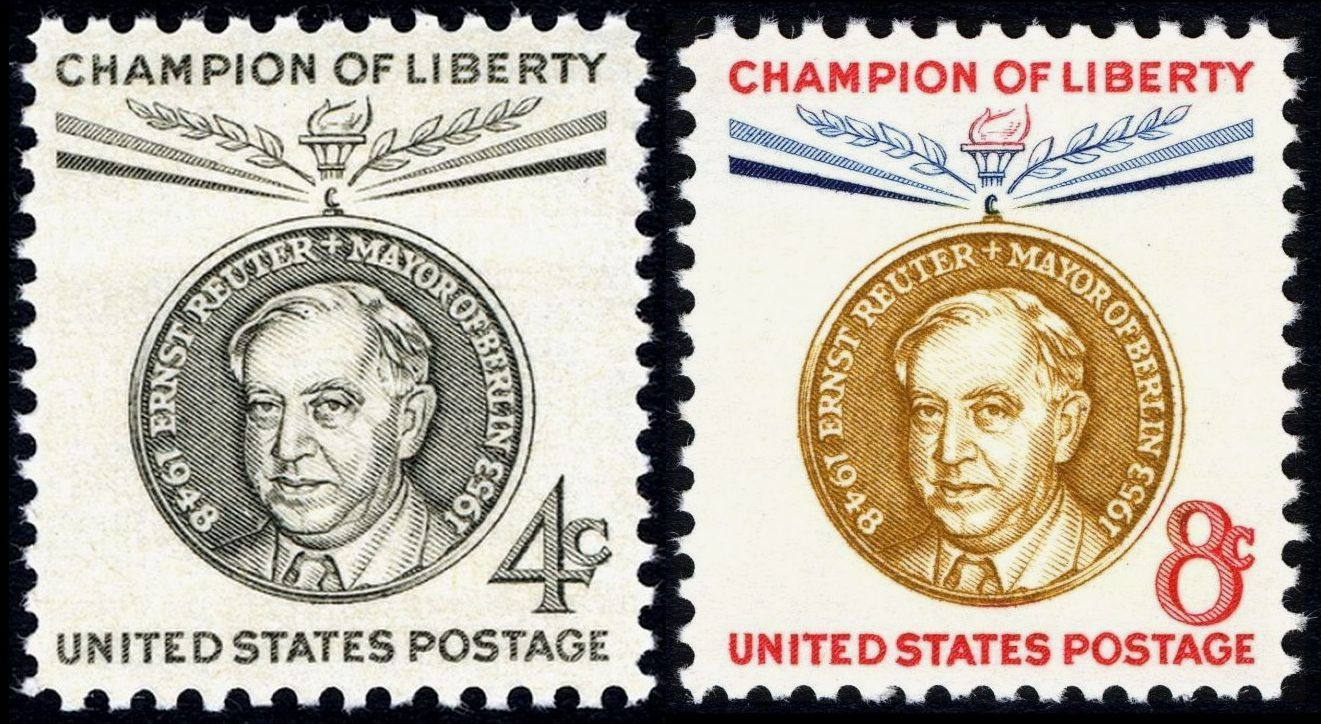
In 1959 the U.S. Government issued two commemorative stamps in honor of Ernst Reuter.

Other towns in Germany have streets or schools named after Ernst Reuter.

The "Champion of Liberty" series issued by the United States Postal Service in 1959 honored Reuter with two stamps for his role in promoting the ideal of a free Berlin, for his significant efforts to unify the western sectors, assisting with the Berlin Airlift and for publicly taking a stance against the Soviet government. The series also served a social and political statement against Soviet totalitarianism during the Cold War.

== Publications ==
- Ernst Reuter: Rationalisierung der Berliner Verkehrsbedienung. Verkehrstechnik (29 June 1928) 9; 26:437–439.
- Ernst Reuter: Die Gründung der Berliner Verkehrs-A.-G. Verkehrstechnik (14 December 1928) 9; 50: 917–919

== Literature ==
- Willy Brandt, Richard Löwenthal: Ernst Reuter. Ein Leben für die Freiheit (Eine politische Biographie). München: Kindler Verlag, 1957
- Klaus Harpprecht: Ernst Reuter. Ein Leben für die Freiheit (Eine Biographie in Bildern und Dokumenten). München: Kindler Verlag, 1957
- Ernst Reuter. Schriften – Reden. Hg. v. Hans E. Hirschfeld und Hans J. Reichardt. Vorwort von Willy Brandt. Bd. 1–4. Frankfurt am Main; Berlin; Wien 1972–1975.
- David E. Barclay: Schaut auf diese Stadt: Der unbekannte Ernst Reuter. Berlin: Siedler Verlag, 2000. ISBN 3-88680-527-1
- Andreas Daum, Kennedy in Berlin. New York: Cambridge University Press, 2008, ISBN 978-0-521-85824-3.
- Joseph Pearson, Sweet Victory: How the Berlin Airlift Divided East and West. New York: Pegasus Books, 2025, ISBN 978-1-63936-858-7.
