= Louise Schroeder =

German politician

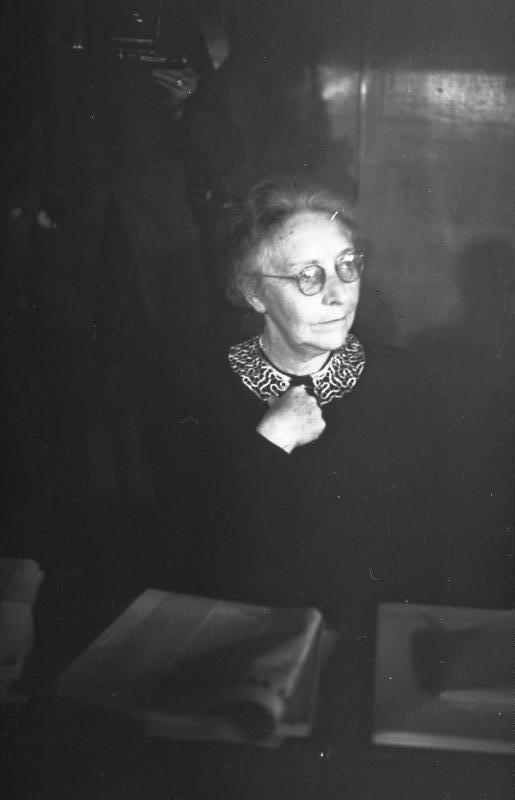
- Louise Schroeder, 1948
- Born: Louise Dorothea Sophie Schroeder; 2 April 1887; Altona, Province of Schleswig-Holstein, Kingdom of Prussia, German empire
- Died: 4 June 1957 (aged 70); West Berlin, West Germany
- Occupations: Politician writer broadcaster
- Political party: SPD

Louise Dorothea Schroeder (2 April 1887 in Altona (Elbe) – 4 June 1957 in West Berlin) was a German politician of the Social Democratic Party of Germany (SPD) party. She was among the 41 female members of the Weimar National Assembly, the Constituent Assembly of the Weimar Republic and subsequently remained a member of the Reichstag until 1933. An educator and activist central in the Arbeiterwohlfahrt (Workers Welfare Institution) movement, and she was under scrutiny of the Nazi Party during the 1930s and 1940s for her socialist positions. After the partition of Germany following World War II, she served as governing mayor of West Berlin in 1948. Until Franziska Giffey was sworn in in 2021, she was the only woman to have served as Mayor of Berlin.

== Life and work ==
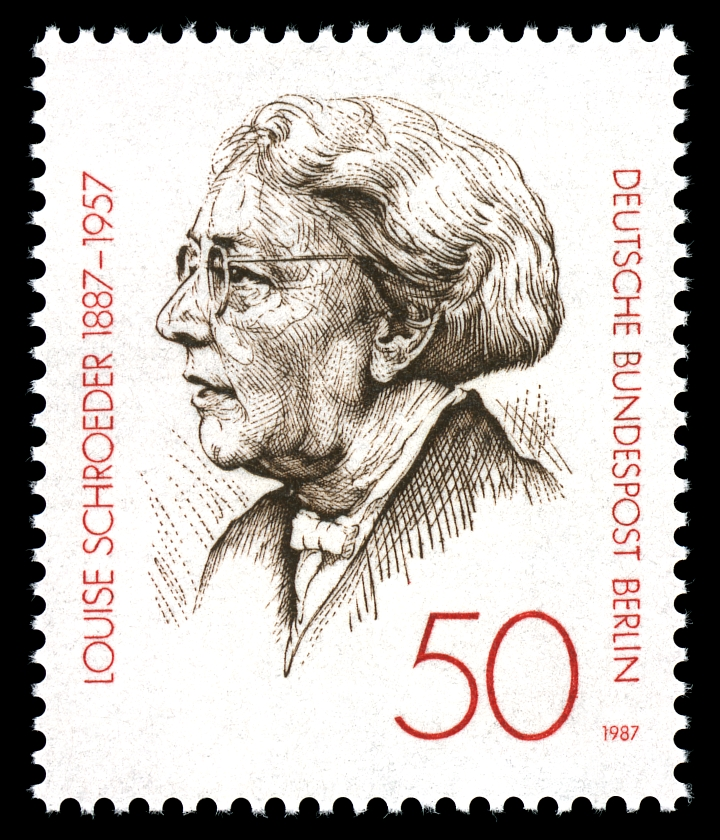
Postage stamp image of Schroeder (1987)

Schroeder was born a short distance to the west of Hamburg, the youngest of four children. Her father, an early participant in Socialist politics, was a construction worker; her mother worked in a vegetable shop.

Schroeder had a significant part in the establishment of the Arbeiterwohlfahrt and from 1925 worked as a lecturer in its school in Berlin. She also held a teaching position at the German University of Politics, now the Otto-Suhr-Institut für Politikwissenschaft (Otto-Suhr Institute for Political Studies) until she was disqualified by the Nazis. Up to the end of the Second World War, she spent time in Hamburg, Berlin and Denmark, even though repeatedly summoned to interrogations.

In 1948 Schroeder belonged to the foundation committee of the Freie Universität Berlin (Free University of Berlin).

== Party ==
She was engaged in the Socialist labour movement from early on and joined the SPD party in 1910, where she dedicated herself to social policy and equal rights for women.

From 1946 to 1951 she was joint editor with Otto Suhr in Berlin of a theoretical fortnightly publication entitled Das sozialistische Jahrhundert (The Socialist Century).

== Political life ==
From 1919 she was one of the youngest members of the national assembly of the Weimar Republic and with the introduction of the female right to vote, Schroeder became its first female member. She held this position until the Nazis seized power in 1933.

After 1945 she worked to restore German democracy, initially as a member of the city council (until 1 February 1952) and from 1949 until her death in 1957 as a member of European Parliament.

== Public offices ==
Social politician Otto Suhr pushed for her becoming mayor, given her already renowned political activities. Due to various tensions in town councils and municipalities, the first postwar mayor Otto Ostrowski stepped down from his position, allowing for Ernst Reuter to be elected into office in June 1947. However, he was not allowed to serve in this position due to Soviet objection. Consequently, Schroeder became acting mayor from 8 May 1947 until 7 December 1948, after which she became mayor of West Berlin until 18 January 1951. Schroeder is the first woman that hold this position in Berlin.

== Honours ==
Louise Schroeder was awarded the Great Cross of Merit with Star and Shoulder Ribbon of the Bundesverdienstkreuz (Federal Cross of Merit).

On 2 April 1957 she was named honorary mayor of Berlin. A square in the Wedding district of Berlin was named after her and later in 1998, the Louise Schroeder Medal was founded.

Since then, the Louise-Schroeder-Gymnasium in Munich was named after her, as well as a conference room of Hamburg Airport, and a street in her birthplace of Hamburg-Altona.

She is mentioned in the Lanny Budd series' book, The Return of Lanny Budd by Upton Sinclair, in 1953.
