= Neukölln 6 =

State electoral district of Germany

- Electoral district for the Berlin House of Representatives
- Neukölln 6 in 2026
- District: Neukölln
- Electorate: 32,621 (2026)

Current electoral district
- Party: CDU
- Member: Olaf Schenk

Neukölln 6 is an electoral constituency (German: Wahlkreis) represented in the House of Representatives of Berlin. It elects one member via first-past-the-post voting.

== Geography ==
The constituency comprises the district of Rudow, the southern area of Gropiusstadt, and the southern area of Frauensiedlung. It is entirely within the borough of Neukölln.

There were 32,621 eligible voters in 2026.

== Members ==
Election	Member	Party	%
1999	Alexander Kaczmarek	CDU	60.6
2001	Sascha Steuer	CDU	43.2
2006	Sascha Steuer	CDU	40.5
2011	Hans-Christian Hausmann	CDU	39.4
2016	Karin Korte	SPD	32.9
2021	Franziska Giffey	SPD	40.8
2023	Olaf Schenk	CDU	45.3
2026	Olaf Schenk	CDU	27.7

== Election results ==
=== 2026 election ===
State election (2026): Neukölln 6
Notes:	Blue background denotes the winner of the electorate vote. Pink background denotes a candidate elected from their party list. Yellow background denotes an electorate win by a list member, or other incumbent. A ✓ or ✗ denotes status of any incumbent, win or lose respectively.						
Party	Candidate	Votes	%	±%	Party votes	%	±%
CDU	✓ Olaf Schenk	6,418	27.7	▼17.7	6,438	27.8	▼16.1
SPD	Franziska Giffey	6,103	26.3	▼3.3	3,884	16.8	▼8.4
AfD	Hendrik Pauli	4,910	21.2	▲10.8	5,151	22.3	▲11.5
Left	Sybille Biermann	3,056	13.2	▲9.5	3,386	14.6	▲11.1
Greens	Asiye Bilir	989	4.3	▼0.9	1,459	6.3	▲0.7
BSW	Christoph Lehmann	855	3.7		1,058	4.6	
Tierschutzpartei	Lena Seitz	581	2.5		620	2.7	▲0.3
FDP					613	2.6	▼1.5
Volt	Nikolai Schirmer	287	1.2		273	1.2	▲0.9
PARTEI					130	0.6	▼0.2
PdF					59	0.3	
ÖDP					26	0.1	Steady
du.					21	0.1	Steady
DKP					14	0.1	Steady
SGP					5	0.0	Steady
Informal votes		457			519		
Total valid votes		23,199			23,137		
Turnout		23,656	72.5	▲9.2			
CDU hold	Majority	315	1.4	▼14.3			

=== 2023 repeat election ===
Changes denoted below for the 2023 election are compared to the 2016 election, as the 2021 election was declared invalid.

State election (2023): Neukölln 6
Notes:	Blue background denotes the winner of the electorate vote. Pink background denotes a candidate elected from their party list. Yellow background denotes an electorate win by a list member, or other incumbent. A ✓ or ✗ denotes status of any incumbent, win or lose respectively.						
Party	Candidate	Votes	%	±%	Party votes	%	±%
CDU	Olaf Schenk	9,190	45.3	▲16.0	8,929	43.9	▲18.3
SPD	Franziska Giffey	5,994	29.6	▲0.4	5,123	25.2	Steady
AfD	Christian Hohmann	2,109	10.4	▼6.9	2,195	10.8	▼6.6
Greens	Philine Niethammer	1,044	5.2	▼4.3	1,146	5.6	▼4.2
Left	Niklas Schrader	735	3.6	▼3.4	726	3.6	▼3.7
FDP	Florian Kluckert	733	3.6	▼3.3	852	4.2	▼3.6
Tierschutzpartei					478	2.4	▲0.3
PARTEI	Sandra Holtermann	315	1.6		154	0.8	▼0.4
Team Todenhöfer					123	0.6	
Gray Panthers					94	0.5	▼0.7
The Grays					88	0.4	
Volt					66	0.3	
Verjüngungsforschung					48	0.2	Steady
dieBasis	Irma Gallwitz	112	0.6		45	0.2	
FW					40	0.2	
Pirates					33	0.2	▼1.0
Mieterpartei					26	0.1	
NPD					25	0.1	▼0.7
Bildet Berlin!					22	0.1	
du.					19	0.1	
ÖDP					18	0.1	
DKP					14	0.1	
DKP					14	0.1	
LKR	Carsten Schanz	36	0.2		13	0.1	▼0.1
The Pinks/Alliance 21					11	0.1	
Klimaliste					9	0.0	
SGP					5	0.0	
BüSo					4	0.0	
Bergpartei, die ÜberPartei					2	0.0	
Informal votes		255			202		
Total valid votes		20,268			20,322		
Turnout		20,537	63.3	▼3.9			
CDU gain from SPD	Majority	3,196	15.7				

=== 2021 election (annulled) ===
The election in 2021 was annulled and rerun in 2023.

State election (2021): Neukölln 6
Notes:	Blue background denotes the winner of the electorate vote. Pink background denotes a candidate elected from their party list. Yellow background denotes an electorate win by a list member, or other incumbent. A ✓ or ✗ denotes status of any incumbent, win or lose respectively.						
Party	Candidate	Votes	%	±%	Party votes	%	±%
SPD	Franziska Giffey	9,771	40.8	▲11.7	8,263	34.2	▲9.0
CDU	Olaf Schenk	6,655	27.8	▼1.5	6,441	26.7	▲1.1
AfD	Christian Hohmann	2,457	10.3	▼7.1	2,524	10.5	▼6.9
FDP	Florian Kluckert	1,619	6.8	▼0.1	1,773	7.3	▼0.4
Greens	Philine Niethammer	1,539	6.4	▼3.0	1,657	6.9	▼3.0
Left	Niklas Schrader	962	4.0	▼3.0	980	4.1	▼3.2
Tierschutzpartei					573	2.4	▲0.3
Team Todenhöfer					407	1.7	
PARTEI	Sandra Holtermann	471	2.0		224	0.9	▼0.3
dieBasis	Irma Gallwitz	374	1.6		218	0.9	
FW					172	0.7	
Gray Panthers					150	0.6	▼0.5
The Grays					149	0.6	
APT					121	0.5	
Volt					105	0.4	
Pirates					68	0.3	▼0.9
Verjüngungsforschung					64	0.3	Steady
LKR	Carsten Schanz	81	0.3		51	0.2	Steady
NPD					40	0.2	▼0.6
Humanists					29	0.1	
du.					28	0.1	
Bildet Berlin!					25	0.1	
Mieterpartei					23	0.1	
ÖDP					21	0.1	
BüSo					12	0.0	
Klimaliste					12	0.0	
DKP					8	0.0	Steady
Bergpartei, die ÜberPartei					6	0.0	
SGP					6	0.0	Steady
The Pinks/Alliance 21					3	0.0	
Informal votes		377			305		
Total valid votes		23,929			24,153		
Turnout		24,489	74.8	▲7.6			
SPD hold	Majority	3,116	13.0				

== See also ==
- Politics of Berlin
- House of Representatives of Berlin
