= Neukölln 1 (electoral district) =

State electoral district of Germany

- Electoral district for the Berlin House of Representatives
- Neukölln 1 in 2026
- District: Neukölln
- Electorate: 31,892 (2026)

Current electoral district
- Party: The Left
- Member: Vanessa Emde

Neukölln 1 is an electoral constituency (German: Wahlkreis) represented in the House of Representatives of Berlin. It elects one member via first-past-the-post voting.

== Geography ==
The constituency comprises area east of the line Karl-Marx-Straße/Weichselstraße/Donaustraße to Treptower Straße and along Sonnenallee within the Berlin Ringbahn, and is entirely within the borough of Neukölln.

There were 31,892 eligible voters in 2023.

== Members ==
Election	Member	Party	%
1990	Joachim Weitzel	CDU	41.7
1995	Winfried Werner	CDU	32.8
1999	Winfried Werner	CDU	41.1
2001	Kirsten Flesch	SPD	38.9
2006	Kirsten Flesch	SPD	38.2
2011	Anja Kofbinger	Greens	32.8
2016	Anja Kofbinger	Greens	31.8
2021	André Schulze	Greens	33.8
2023	André Schulze	Greens	35.1
2026	Vanessa Emde	Left	46.2

== Election results ==
=== 2026 election ===
State election (2026): Neukölln 1
Notes:	Blue background denotes the winner of the electorate vote. Pink background denotes a candidate elected from their party list. Yellow background denotes an electorate win by a list member, or other incumbent. A ✓ or ✗ denotes status of any incumbent, win or lose respectively.						
Party	Candidate	Votes	%	±%	Party votes	%	±%
Left	Vanessa Emde	10,731	46.2	▲19.9	11,708	50.1	▲25.3
Greens	✗ André Schulze	6,026	25.9	▼9.2	4,885	20.9	▼14.5
SPD	Anne Roever	2,163	9.3	▼5.6	2,056	8.8	▼5.6
CDU	Davide Annone	1,404	6.0	▼4.6	1,420	6.1	▼4.2
AfD	Tobias Bruns	1,271	5.5	▲2.0	1,281	5.5	▲2.1
BSW	Wiebke Diehl	719	3.1		747	3.2	
PARTEI	Almut Buchwald	385	1.7	▼1.5	231	1.0	▼1.5
Volt	Johanna Isensee	318	1.4		354	1.5	▲0.6
Tierschutzpartei					307	1.3	▼0.4
Independent	Albert Ngwa	207	0.9				
FDP					205	0.9	▼0.9
DKP					38	0.2	▼0.1
PdF					38	0.2	
du.					37	0.2	▼0.4
SGP					28	0.1	Steady
ÖDP					17	0.1	Steady
Informal votes		311			183		
Total valid votes		23,224			23,352		
Turnout		23,535	73.8	▲12.9			
Left gain from Greens	Majority	4,705	20.3				

=== 2023 repeat election ===
Changes denoted below for the 2023 election are compared to the 2016 election, as the 2021 election was declared invalid.

State election (2023): Neukölln 1
Notes:	Blue background denotes the winner of the electorate vote. Pink background denotes a candidate elected from their party list. Yellow background denotes an electorate win by a list member, or other incumbent. A ✓ or ✗ denotes status of any incumbent, win or lose respectively.						
Party	Candidate	Votes	%	±%	Party votes	%	±%
Greens	André Schulze	6,661	35.1	▲7.9	6,721	35.4	▲9.2
Left	Lucy Redler	4,981	26.3	▲7.0	4,713	24.8	▲3.7
SPD	Timo Schramm	2,823	14.9	▼8.0	2,733	14.4	▼4.7
CDU	Sabine Güldner	2,021	10.7	▼0.1	1,957	10.3	▲0.2
AfD	Peter Wüstenberg	650	3.4	▼4.8	645	3.4	▼4.8
PARTEI	Philipp Kottsiepe	600	3.2	▼1.2	468	2.5	▼1.6
Tierschutzpartei	Ishai Rosenbaum	415	2.2		319	1.7	Steady
du.	Edwin Florina Greve	368	1.9		115	0.6	
FDP	Roland Leppek	295	1.6	▼1.7	343	1.8	▼1.9
Volt					166	0.9	
Klimaliste					143	0.8	
Team Todenhöfer					135	0.7	
dieBasis	Andreas Knopp	156	0.8		113	0.6	
Pirates					73	0.4	▼2.4
Mieterpartei					53	0.3	
DKP					50	0.3	▼0.1
Bergpartei, die ÜberPartei					41	0.2	
Humanists					33	0.2	
Verjüngungsforschung					30	0.2	▼0.2
The Grays					30	0.2	
Gray Panthers					28	0.1	▼0.5
FW					23	0.1	
SGP					14	0.1	▼0.2
ÖDP					12	0.1	
Bildet Berlin!					11	0.1	
The Pinks/Alliance 21					8	0.0	
LKR					6	0.0	▼0.3
NPD					4	0.0	▼0.5
BüSo					2	0.0	▼0.2
Informal votes		123			95		
Total valid votes		18,970			18,989		
Turnout		19,104	60.9	▼5.0			
Greens hold	Majority	1,680	8.8				

=== 2021 election (annulled) ===
The election in 2021 was annulled and rerun in 2023.

State election (2021): Neukölln 1
Notes:	Blue background denotes the winner of the electorate vote. Pink background denotes a candidate elected from their party list. Yellow background denotes an electorate win by a list member, or other incumbent. A ✓ or ✗ denotes status of any incumbent, win or lose respectively.						
Party	Candidate	Votes	%	±%	Party votes	%	±%
Greens	André Schulze	7,958	33.8	▲6.7	7,571	32.1	▲5.9
Left	Lucy Redler	6,255	26.6	▲7.4	6,230	26.4	▲5.3
SPD	Timo Schramm	4,323	18.4	▼4.5	3,991	16.9	▼2.2
CDU	Sabine Güldner	1,513	6.4	▼4.3	1,329	5.6	▼4.4
PARTEI	Philipp Kottsiepe	727	3.1	▼1.3	595	2.5	▼1.5
AfD	Peter Wüstenberg	726	3.1	▼5.2	719	3.0	▼5.2
FDP	Roland Leppek	655	2.8	▼0.5	630	2.7	▼1.1
Tierschutzpartei	Ishai Rosenbaum	534	2.3		304	1.3	▼0.4
du.	Edwin Florina Greve	413	1.8		147	0.6	
dieBasis	Andreas Knopp	409	1.7		334	1.4	
Team Todenhöfer					492	2.1	
Klimaliste					289	1.2	
Volt					278	1.2	
Pirates					109	0.5	▼2.4
FW					98	0.4	
Bergpartei, die ÜberPartei					72	0.3	
The Grays					60	0.3	
Mieterpartei					55	0.2	
APT					54	0.2	
Gray Panthers					53	0.2	▼0.4
Humanists					46	0.2	
DKP					42	0.2	▼0.2
ÖDP					24	0.1	
Verjüngungsforschung					18	0.1	▼0.3
SGP					12	0.1	▼0.3
Bildet Berlin!					9	0.0	
LKR					7	0.0	▼0.3
The Pinks/Alliance 21					7	0.0	
NPD					4	0.0	▼0.5
BüSo					1	0.0	▼0.2
Informal votes		254			199		
Total valid votes		23,513			23,580		
Turnout		23,821	75.0	▲9.0			
Greens hold	Majority	1,703	7.2				

== See also ==
- Politics of Berlin
- House of Representatives of Berlin
