= Steglitz-Zehlendorf 1 =

State electoral district of Germany

- Electoral district for the Berlin House of Representatives
- Steglitz-Zehlendorf 1 in 2026
- District: Steglitz-Zehlendorf
- Electorate: 32,046 (2026)

Current electoral district
- Party: Alliance 90/The Greens
- Member: Tonka Wojahn

Steglitz-Zehlendorf 1 is an electoral constituency (German: Wahlkreis) represented in the House of Representatives of Berlin. It elects one member via first-past-the-post voting.

== Geography ==
The constituency comprises the areas of Breitenbachplatz, Schloßtraße, Lauenburger Platz, Grunewaldstraße, and Asternplatz, within the district of Steglitz and the borough of Steglitz-Zehlendorf.

There were 32,046 eligible voters in 2026.

== Members ==
Election	Member	Party	%
1999	Cerstin Richter-Kotowski	CDU	46.7
2001	Klaus Böger	SPD	41.5
2006	Andreas Kugler	SPD	37.8
2011	Cerstin Richter-Kotowski	CDU	30.3
2016	Andreas Kugler	SPD	26.0
2021	Benedict Lux	Greens	28.9
2023	Claudia Wein	CDU	30.2
2026	Tonka Wojahn	Greens	24.6

== Election results ==
=== 2026 election ===
State election (2026): Steglitz-Zehlendorf 1
Notes:	Blue background denotes the winner of the electorate vote. Pink background denotes a candidate elected from their party list. Yellow background denotes an electorate win by a list member, or other incumbent. A ✓ or ✗ denotes status of any incumbent, win or lose respectively.						
Party	Candidate	Votes	%	±%	Party votes	%	±%
Greens	Tonka Wojahn	6,219	24.6	▼4.0	5,108	20.1	▼3.3
CDU	✗ Claudia Wein	6,147	24.3	▼5.8	6,013	23.7	▼5.0
Left	Marcus Otto	4,253	16.8	▲11.1	5,185	20.4	▲12.8
SPD	Franziska Grün	4,135	16.4	▼3.5	3,963	15.6	▼4.9
AfD	Kristin Brinker	2,354	9.3	▲4.0	2,313	9.1	▲3.8
BSW	Sabine Zimmer	750	3.0		788	3.1	
FDP	Katharina Concu	723	2.9	▼2.0	750	3.0	▼3.6
Volt	Nina Schäffler	691	2.7		571	2.2	▲1.0
Tierschutzpartei					387	1.5	▼0.5
PARTEI					179	0.7	▼0.6
PdF					80	0.3	
ÖDP					42	0.2	▲0.1
du.					17	0.1	▼0.1
SGP					12	0.0	
DKP					11	0.0	Steady
Informal votes		345			198		
Total valid votes		25,272			25,419		
Turnout		25,617	79.9	▲9.0			
Greens gain from CDU	Majority	72	0.3				

=== 2023 repeat election ===
Changes denoted below for the 2023 election are compared to the 2016 election, as the 2021 election was declared invalid.

State election (2023): Steglitz-Zehlendorf 1
Notes:	Blue background denotes the winner of the electorate vote. Pink background denotes a candidate elected from their party list. Yellow background denotes an electorate win by a list member, or other incumbent. A ✓ or ✗ denotes status of any incumbent, win or lose respectively.						
Party	Candidate	Votes	%	±%	Party votes	%	±%
CDU	Claudia Wein	6,696	30.2	7.1	6,383	28.7	▲7.6
Greens	Benedikt Lux	6,353	28.6	▲5.0	5,214	23.4	▲2.9
SPD	✗ Andreas Kugler	4,420	19.9	▼6.1	4,566	20.5	▼2.9
Left	Selim Akarsu	1,279	5.8	▼1.3	1,680	7.6	▼1.3
AfD	Kristin Brinker	1,173	5.3	▼4.0	1,183	5.3	▼4.2
FDP	Antje Schönfelder	1,077	4.9	▼2.4	1,449	6.5	▼2.9
Tierschutzpartei	Ingeborg Elisabeth Çetin	558	2.5		450	2.0	▲0.3
PARTEI	Richard Kummert	336	1.5	▼0.1	282	1.3	▼0.2
Volt					279	1.3	
dieBasis	Friederike Kaiser	148	0.7		121	0.5	
The Grays					78	0.4	
Gray Panthers					76	0.3	▼0.5
Pirates	Wolfgang Thiele	85	0.4	▼1.6	66	0.3	▼1.4
Klimaliste					63	0.3	
Team Todenhöfer					52	0.2	
Mieterpartei					48	0.2	
Humanists					42	0.2	
du.					41	0.2	
FW	Bianka Aversente	78	0.4		33	0.1	
Verjüngungsforschung					32	0.1	▼0.3
ÖDP					21	0.1	
Bildet Berlin!					17	0.1	
DKP					16	0.1	▼0.1
The Pinks/Alliance 21					12	0.1	
NPD					11	0.0	▼0.1
LKR					9	0.0	▼0.3
Bergpartei, die ÜberPartei					7	0.0	
BüSo					5	0.0	Steady
SGP					4	0.0	Steady
Informal votes		134			111		
Total valid votes		22,203			22,240		
Turnout		22,369	70.9	▼2.8			
CDU gain from SPD	Majority	343	3.6				

=== 2021 election (annulled) ===
The election in 2021 was annulled and rerun in 2023.

State election (2021): Steglitz-Zehlendorf 1
Notes:	Blue background denotes the winner of the electorate vote. Pink background denotes a candidate elected from their party list. Yellow background denotes an electorate win by a list member, or other incumbent. A ✓ or ✗ denotes status of any incumbent, win or lose respectively.						
Party	Candidate	Votes	%	±%	Party votes	%	±%
Greens	Benedikt Lux	7,376	28.9	▲5.3	6,331	24.6	▲4.1
SPD	✗ Andreas Kugler	6,065	23.8	▼2.2	5,827	22.7	▼0.7
CDU	Claudia Wein	5,417	21.2	▼1.9	5,016	19.5	▼1.6
FDP	Antje Schönfelder	1,930	7.6	▲0.3	2,368	9.2	▼0.2
Left	Selim Akarsu	1,681	6.6	▼0.5	2,182	8.5	▼0.4
AfD	Kristin Brinker	1,190	4.7	▼4.6	1,188	4.6	▼4.9
Tierschutzpartei	Ingeborg Elisabeth Çetin	626	2.5		443	1.7	Steady
Volt					399	1.6	
PARTEI	Richard Kummert	456	1.8	▲0.1	394	1.5	▲0.1
dieBasis	Friederike Kaiser	415	1.6		348	1.4	
FW	Bianka Aversente	230	0.9		179	0.7	
Team Todenhöfer					177	0.7	
Pirates	Wolfgang Thiele	132	0.5	▼1.5	113	0.4	▼1.3
The Grays					112	0.4	
Gray Panthers					103	0.4	▼0.5
Klimaliste					94	0.4	
APT					86	0.3	
Verjüngungsforschung					55	0.2	▼0.2
Humanists					53	0.2	
Mieterpartei					49	0.2	
ÖDP					42	0.2	
du.					38	0.1	
Bildet Berlin!					36	0.1	
DKP					14	0.1	▼0.1
NPD					13	0.1	▼0.1
The Pinks/Alliance 21					13	0.1	
Bergpartei, die ÜberPartei					10	0.0	
LKR					10	0.0	▼0.3
BüSo					5	0.0	Steady
SGP					5	0.0	Steady
Informal votes		259			203		
Total valid votes		25,518			25,703		
Turnout		25,950	81.8	▲8.0			
Greens gain from SPD	Majority	1,311	5.1				

== See also ==
- Politics of Berlin
- House of Representatives of Berlin
