= Steglitz-Zehlendorf 3 =

State electoral district of Germany

- Electoral district for the Berlin House of Representatives
- Steglitz-Zehlendorf 3 in 2026
- District: Steglitz-Zehlendorf
- Electorate: 31,328 (2026)

Current electoral district
- Party: CDU
- Member: Jens Hoffmann

Steglitz-Zehlendorf 3 is an electoral constituency (German: Wahlkreis) represented in the House of Representatives of Berlin. It elects one member via first-past-the-post voting.

== Geography ==
The constituency comprises the areas of Augustaplatz, Finkensteinallee, Goerzallee, Dahlemer Weg, Teltower Damm, and Sachtlebenstraße of the Lichterfelde West district; and the Schönow area of the Zehlendorf district, entirely within the borough of Steglitz-Zehlendorf.

There were 31,328 eligible voters in 2026.

== Members ==
Election	Member	Party	%
1999	Ulrich Manske	CDU	53.3
2001	Klaus-Rüdiger Landowsky	SPD	37.3
2006	Christian Goiny	CDU	38.2
2011	Christian Goiny	CDU	42.3
2016	Christian Goiny	CDU	32.1
2021	Christian Goiny	CDU	31.3
2023	Christian Goiny	CDU	40.5
2026	Jens Hoffmann	CDU	33.3

== Election results ==
=== 2026 election ===
State election (2026): Steglitz-Zehlendorf 3
Notes:	Blue background denotes the winner of the electorate vote. Pink background denotes a candidate elected from their party list. Yellow background denotes an electorate win by a list member, or other incumbent. A ✓ or ✗ denotes status of any incumbent, win or lose respectively.						
Party	Candidate	Votes	%	±%	Party votes	%	±%
CDU	Jens Hoffmann	8,398	33.3	▼7.2	8,267	32.5	▼4.3
Greens	Rena Peterson	5,275	20.9	▲1.6	4,476	17.6	▼0.4
SPD	Martin Matz	4,327	17.1	▼4.5	4,108	16.2	▼4.3
Left	Dennis Egginger-Gonzalez	2,573	10.2	▲6.3	3,145	12.4	▲7.5
AfD	Peer Döhnert	2,469	9.8	▲5.0	2,553	10.0	▲5.1
FDP	Jan Trommershausen	954	3.8	▼2.2	1,027	4.0	▼4.7
Volt	Ingo Partey	693	2.7		679	2.7	▲1.6
BSW	Andreas Heidloff	565	2.2		611	2.4	
Tierschutzpartei					334	1.3	▼0.3
PARTEI					104	0.4	▼0.4
PdF					72	0.3	
ÖDP					26	0.1	Steady
du.					16	0.1	Steady
DKP					11	0.0	Steady
SGP					6	0.0	Steady
Informal votes		362			181		
Total valid votes		25,254			25,435		
Turnout		25,616	81.8	▲7.3			
CDU hold	Majority	3,123	12.4	▼6.4			

=== 2023 repeat election ===
Changes denoted below for the 2023 election are compared to the 2016 election, as the 2021 election was declared invalid.

State election (2023): Steglitz-Zehlendorf 3
Notes:	Blue background denotes the winner of the electorate vote. Pink background denotes a candidate elected from their party list. Yellow background denotes an electorate win by a list member, or other incumbent. A ✓ or ✗ denotes status of any incumbent, win or lose respectively.						
Party	Candidate	Votes	%	±%	Party votes	%	±%
CDU	✓ Christian Goiny	9,876	40.5	▲8.4	9,034	36.8	▲8.9
SPD	Martin Matz	5,283	21.7	▼3.1	5,015	20.4	▼1.2
Greens	Mariella Andrea Gabriele Perna	4,693	19.2	▲2.2	4,412	18.0	▲1.3
FDP	Jan Trommershausen	1,446	5.9	▼3.9	2,133	8.7	▼3.9
AfD	Volker Graffstädt	1,161	4.8	▼4.8	1,220	5.0	▼4.8
Left	Dennis Egginger-Gonzalez	942	3.9	▼1.2	1,200	4.9	▼1.3
Tierschutzpartei	Sebastian Fiedler	497	2.0		385	1.6	▲0.1
Volt					267	1.1	
PARTEI	Knut Steenwerth	234	1.0		190	0.8	▼0.1
dieBasis	Detlef Waldemar Simon Wiechers	165	0.7		119	0.5	
Gray Panthers					61	0.2	▼0.3
Team Todenhöfer					61	0.2	
The Grays					60	0.2	
Verjüngungsforschung					52	0.2	▼0.1
FW					48	0.2	
Pirates	Lothar Kurtz	94	0.4	▼1.3	47	0.2	▼1.0
Klimaliste					37	0.2	
ÖDP					34	0.1	
Humanists					27	0.1	
Mieterpartei					26	0.1	
Bergpartei, die ÜberPartei					20	0.1	
Bildet Berlin!					17	0.1	
du.					17	0.1	
DKP					15	0.1	Steady
NPD					9	0.0	▼0.1
The Pinks/Alliance 21					7	0.0	
LKR					6	0.0	▼0.3
SGP					6	0.0	Steady
BüSo					2	0.0	▼0.1
Informal votes		267			137		
Total valid votes		24,391			24,527		
Turnout		24,683	74.4	▼2.9			
CDU hold	Majority	4,593	18.8				

=== 2021 election (annulled) ===
The election in 2021 was annulled and rerun in 2023.

State election (2021): Steglitz-Zehlendorf 3
Notes:	Blue background denotes the winner of the electorate vote. Pink background denotes a candidate elected from their party list. Yellow background denotes an electorate win by a list member, or other incumbent. A ✓ or ✗ denotes status of any incumbent, win or lose respectively.						
Party	Candidate	Votes	%	±%	Party votes	%	±%
CDU	✓ Christian Goiny	8,611	31.3	▼0.8	7,572	27.4	▼0.5
SPD	Martin Matz	6,423	23.3	▼1.4	6,151	22.3	▲0.6
Greens	Mariella Andrea Gabriele Perna	5,916	21.5	▲4.4	5,655	20.5	▲3.7
FDP	Jan Trommershausen	2,576	9.4	▼0.5	3,247	11.8	▼0.8
AfD	Volker Graffstädt	1,228	4.5	▼5.2	1,290	4.7	▼5.1
Left	Dennis Egginger-Gonzalez	1,106	4.0	▼1.0	1,429	5.2	▼1.0
Tierschutzpartei	Sebastian Fiedler	621	2.3		431	1.6	▲0.1
dieBasis	Detlef Waldemar Simon Wiechers	391	1.4		338	1.2	
PARTEI	Knut Steenwerth	312	1.1		260	0.9	▲0.1
FW	?	233	0.8		172	0.6	
Pirates	Lothar Kurtz	130	0.5	▼1.2	86	0.3	▼0.9
Volt					322	1.2	
Team Todenhöfer					99	0.4	
APT					83	0.3	
The Grays					83	0.3	
Klimaliste					74	0.3	
Gray Panthers					60	0.2	▼0.3
Humanists					52	0.2	
Verjüngungsforschung					38	0.1	▼0.1
ÖDP					32	0.1	
Bildet Berlin!					26	0.1	
Mieterpartei					26	0.1	
NPD					21	0.1	▼0.1
du.					19	0.1	
LKR					16	0.1	▼0.3
Bergpartei, die ÜberPartei					13	0.0	
DKP					10	0.0	Steady
BüSo					7	0.0	▼0.1
SGP					4	0.0	Steady
The Pinks/Alliance 21					3	0.0	
Informal votes		269			180		
Total valid votes		27,547			27,619		
Turnout		27,890	83.6	▲6.2			
CDU hold	Majority	2,188	8.0				

== See also ==
- Politics of Berlin
- House of Representatives of Berlin
