= Mitte 4 =

State electoral district of Germany

- Electoral district for the Berlin House of Representatives
- Mitte 4 in 2026
- District: Mitte
- Electorate: 29,424 (2026)

Current electoral district
- Party: Green
- Member: Taylan Kurt

Mitte 4 is an electoral constituency (German: Wahlkreis) represented in the House of Representatives of Berlin. It elects one member via first-past-the-post voting.

== Geography ==
The constituency comprises the areas of Northern Moabit and Westhafen within the borough of Mitte.

There were 29,424 eligible voters in 2026.

== Members ==
Election	Member	Party	%
2006	Jutta Leder	SPD	38.9
2011	İlkin Özışık	SPD	29.2
2016	Marc Urbatsch	A90	24.2
2021	Taylan Kurt	A90	36.9
2023	Taylan Kurt	A90	40.1
2026	Taylan Kurt	A90	36.6

== Election results ==
=== 2026 election ===
State election (2026): Mitte 4
Notes:	Blue background denotes the winner of the electorate vote. Pink background denotes a candidate elected from their party list. Yellow background denotes an electorate win by a list member, or other incumbent. A ✓ or ✗ denotes status of any incumbent, win or lose respectively.						
Party	Candidate	Votes	%	±%	Party votes	%	±%
Greens	✓ Taylan Kurt	7,737	36.6	▼3.5	4,500	21.2	▼13.1
Left	Jacqueline Sanehy	6,550	31.0	▲13.4	8,695	40.9	▲24.1
CDU	Sven Fervers	1,962	9.3	▼6.5	2,109	9.9	▼5.7
SPD	Federico Quadrelli	1,775	8.4	▼5.8	2,231	10.5	▼4.2
AfD	Eduard Müller	1,484	7.0	▲2.6	1,496	7.0	▲2.5
BSW	Dunya El Amrani	695	3.3		854	4.0	
Volt	Johanna Drechsel	386	1.8		442	2.1	▲0.4
FDP	Beatrice Höllen	317	1.5	▼1.9	360	1.7	▼2.1
Tierschutzpartei					270	1.3	▼0.7
PARTEI	Jeremy Ferguson	247	1.2	▼1.6	161	0.8	▼1.1
PdF					64	0.3	
ÖDP					29	0.1	Steady
DKP					21	0.1	Steady
du.					12	0.1	▼0.2
SGP					8	0.0	▼0.1
Informal votes		281			182		
Total valid votes		21,153			21,252		
Turnout		21,434	72.8	▲13.4			
Greens hold	Majority	1,178	5.6	▼17.0			

=== 2023 repeat election ===
Changes denoted below for the 2023 election are compared to the 2016 election, as the 2021 election was declared invalid.

State election (2023): Mitte 4
Notes:	Blue background denotes the winner of the electorate vote. Pink background denotes a candidate elected from their party list. Yellow background denotes an electorate win by a list member, or other incumbent. A ✓ or ✗ denotes status of any incumbent, win or lose respectively.						
Party	Candidate	Votes	%	±%	Party votes	%	±%
Greens	✓ Taylan Kurt	6,837	40.1	▲15.9	5,853	34.3	▲8.6
Left	Stephan Rauhut	2,987	17.5	▼1.6	2,866	16.8	Steady
CDU	Christiane Holm	2,696	15.8	▲4.0	2,663	15.6	▲4.0
SPD	Daniel Bussenius	2,414	14.2	▼9.5	2,509	14.7	▼6.7
AfD	Kai Borrmann	750	4.4	▼4.0	776	4.6	▼3.7
FDP	Nikoline Hansen	584	3.4	▼0.9	650	3.8	▼1.4
Tierschutzpartei					343	2.0	▲0.2
PARTEI	Martin Pohlmann	465	2.7	▼0.7	323	1.9	▼1.8
Volt					286	1.7	
Team Todenhöfer					141	0.8	
Klimaliste					99	0.6	
dieBasis	Ingo Turtenwald	125	0.7		90	0.5	
DIE FRAUEN	Sigrid Werner	111	0.7				
Pirates					81	0.5	▼2.5
du.					47	0.3	
Gray Panthers					43	0.3	▼0.4
Humanists					43	0.3	
Mieterpartei					39	0.2	
The Grays					28	0.2	
ÖDP	Daniel Schönherr	56	0.3		26	0.2	
Bergpartei, die ÜberPartei					25	0.1	
FW					23	0.1	
Bildet Berlin!					21	0.1	
DKP					20	0.1	▼0.1
SGP					18	0.1	▼0.1
REP	Lorenz Buschbeck	15	0.1				
Verjüngungsforschung					14	0.1	▼0.2
The Pinks/Alliance 21					10	0.1	
NPD					8	0.0	▼0.2
LKR					5	0.2	▼0.3
BüSo					2	0.0	Steady
Informal votes		136			108		
Total valid votes		17,040			17,052		
Turnout		17,194	59.4	▼3.1			
Greens hold	Majority	3,850	22.6				

=== 2021 election (annulled) ===
The election in 2021 was annulled and rerun in 2023.

State election (2021): Mitte 4
Notes:	Blue background denotes the winner of the electorate vote. Pink background denotes a candidate elected from their party list. Yellow background denotes an electorate win by a list member, or other incumbent. A ✓ or ✗ denotes status of any incumbent, win or lose respectively.						
Party	Candidate	Votes	%	±%	Party votes	%	±%
Greens	✓ Taylan Kurt	7,832	36.9	▲12.7	6,897	32.3	▲6.6
Left	Stephan Rauhut	3,871	18.2	▼0.9	3,882	18.2	▲1.3
SPD	Daniel Bussenius	3,826	18.0	▼5.6	3,574	16.7	▼4.7
CDU	Christiane Holm	2,047	9.6	▼2.2	1,975	9.2	▼2.4
FDP	Nikoline Hansen	1,116	5.3	▲0.9	1,173	5.5	▲0.3
AfD	Kai Borrmann	865	4.1	▼4.3	855	4.0	▼4.3
Team Todenhöfer					538	2.5	
PARTEI	Martin Pohlmann	622	2.9	▼0.5	517	2.4	▼1.2
Volt					372	1.7	
Tierschutzpartei		509	2.4		364	1.7	▼0.1
dieBasis	Ingo Turtenwald	333	1.6		262	1.2	
Klimaliste					233	1.1	
DIE FRAUEN	Sigrid Werner	120	0.6				
Pirates					97	0.5	▼2.5
FW					89	0.4	
du.					74	0.3	
APT					66	0.3	
The Grays					66	0.3	
Humanists					65	0.3	
Mieterpartei					45	0.2	
Gray Panthers					43	0.2	▼0.4
Bergpartei, die ÜberPartei					33	0.2	
Bildet Berlin!					29	0.1	
ÖDP	Daniel Schönherr	62	0.3		27	0.1	
DKP					27	0.1	▼0.1
Verjüngungsforschung					23	0.1	▼0.1
REP	Lorenz Buschbeck	18	0.1				
The Pinks/Alliance 21					14	0.1	
LKR					8	0.0	▼0.3
NPD					8	0.0	▼0.2
BüSo					5	0.0	Steady
SGP					4	0.0	▼0.2
Informal votes		238			170		
Total valid votes		21,221			21,365		
Turnout		21,552	74.4	▲11.8			
Greens hold	Majority	3,961	18.7				

== See also ==
- Politics of Berlin
- House of Representatives of Berlin
