= Friedrichshain-Kreuzberg 2 =

State electoral district of Germany

- Electoral district for the Berlin House of Representatives
- Friedrichshain-Kreuzberg 2 in 2026
- District: Friedrichshain-Kreuzberg
- Electorate: 33,942 (2026)

Current electoral district
- Party: The Left
- Member: Michael Efler

Friedrichshain-Kreuzberg 2 is an electoral constituency (German: Wahlkreis) represented in the House of Representatives of Berlin. It elects one member via first-past-the-post voting.

== Geography ==
The constituency comprises the areas of Wassertorplatz, Graefekiez, Reichenberger Straße, and Wrangelkiez within the borough of Friedrichshain-Kreuzberg.

There were 33,942 eligible voters in 2026.

== Members ==
Election	Member	Party	%
1995	Barbara Oesterheld	Green	39.4
1999	Barbara Oesterheld	Green	38.5
2001	Barbara Oesterheld	Green	36.2
2006	Dirk Behrendt	Green	42.4
2011	Dirk Behrendt	Green	49.8
2016	Marianne Burkert-Eulitz	Green	33.4
2021	Marianne Burkert-Eulitz	Green	38.5
2023	Marianne Burkert-Eulitz	Green	37.9
2026	Michael Efler	Left	37.1

== Election results ==
=== 2026 election ===
Katrin Schmidberger was the incumbent member for the Friedrichshain-Kreuzberg 1 constituency.

State election (2026): Friedrichshain-Kreuzberg 2
Notes:	Blue background denotes the winner of the electorate vote. Pink background denotes a candidate elected from their party list. Yellow background denotes an electorate win by a list member, or other incumbent. A ✓ or ✗ denotes status of any incumbent, win or lose respectively.						
Party	Candidate	Votes	%	±%	Party votes	%	±%
Left	Michael Efler	9,962	37.1	▲18.8	11,453	42.4	▲22.9
Greens	✗ Katrin Schmidberger*	8,990	33.5	▼9.4	7,049	26.1	▼14.1
SPD	Britt Schlünz	2,670	9.9	▼5.7	2,907	10.8	▼4.1
CDU	Timur Husein	2,012	7.5	▼4.5	2,165	8.0	▼3.5
AfD	Andreas Klaus	931	3.5	▲1.4	959	3.6	▲1.4
BSW	Simin Falsafi	657	2.4		843	3.1	
Volt	Susanne Zels	586	2.2		596	2.2	▲0.9
Tierschutzpartei	Jacqueline Görgen	358	1.3	▼0.6	291	1.1	▼0.4
FDP	Matthias Morrkopf-Widlok	344	1.3	▼1.5	375	1.4	▼1.8
PARTEI	Jan-Marcel Bundels	281	1.0	▼2.1	223	0.8	▼1.4
MERA25	Johannes Fehr	74	0.3				
PdF					53	0.2	
DKP					29	0.1	Steady
du.					28	0.1	▼0.3
ÖDP					26	0.1	
Bergpartei, die ÜberPartei					10	0.0	Steady
SGP					6	0.0	Steady
Informal votes		320			172		
Total valid votes		26,865			27,013		
Turnout		27,185	80.1	▲11.9			
Left gain from Greens	Majority	972	3.6				

=== 2023 repeat election ===
Changes denoted below for the 2023 election are compared to the 2016 election, as the 2021 election was declared invalid.

State election (2023): Friedrichshain-Kreuzberg 2
Notes:	Blue background denotes the winner of the electorate vote. Pink background denotes a candidate elected from their party list. Yellow background denotes an electorate win by a list member, or other incumbent. A ✓ or ✗ denotes status of any incumbent, win or lose respectively.						
Party	Candidate	Votes	%	±%	Party votes	%	±%
Greens	✓ Marianne Burkert-Eulitz	6,349	37.9	▼0.6	6,414	38.3	▲4.4
Left	Elif Aralp	4,531	27.1	▲5.9	4,089	24.4	▲0.9
SPD	Niklas Kossow	2,183	13.0	▼4.4	2,128	12.7	▼3.9
CDU	Hikmet Gülmez	1,833	11.0	▲4.4	1,714	10.2	▲4.1
PARTEI	Philipp Kutz	572	3.4	▼1.9	458	2.7	▼1.8
FDP	Johannes Dalheimer	388	2.3	▼0.5	410	2.4	▼0.7
AfD	Olaf Krüger	327	2.0	▼1.3	329	2.0	▼2.2
Tierschutzpartei	Sunna Becker	306	1.8		246	1.5	Steady
Volt					171	1.0	
Team Todenhöfer					157	0.9	
Klimaliste					138	0.8	
dieBasis	Uwe Weiß	119	0.7		101	0.6	
du.					98	0.6	
Pirates	Franz Josef Schmitt	95	0.6	▼2.8	64	0.4	▼2.5
DKP					44	0.3	▼0.2
Mieterpartei					40	0.2	
Bergpartei, die ÜberPartei					30	0.2	▼0.5
Independent	Oliver Snelinski	28	0.2				
Humanists					25	0.1	
The Grays					21	0.1	
Gray Panthers					19	0.1	▼0.3
SGP					17	0.1	▼0.2
FW					11	0.1	
Verjüngungsforschung					10	0.1	▼0.3
ÖDP					9	0.1	▼0.3
Bildet Berlin!					8	0.0	
The Pinks/Alliance 21					4	0.0	
NPD					4	0.0	▼0.3
LKR					3	0.0	▼0.3
BüSo					0	0.0	Steady
Informal votes		145			94		
Total valid votes		16,731			16,762		
Turnout		16,888	64.5	▼8.1			
Greens hold	Majority	1,818	10.8				

=== 2021 election (annulled) ===
The election in 2021 was annulled and rerun in 2023.

State election (2021): Friedrichshain-Kreuzberg 2
Notes:	Blue background denotes the winner of the electorate vote. Pink background denotes a candidate elected from their party list. Yellow background denotes an electorate win by a list member, or other incumbent. A ✓ or ✗ denotes status of any incumbent, win or lose respectively.						
Party	Candidate	Votes	%	±%	Party votes	%	±%
Greens	✓ Marianne Burkert-Eulitz	7,833	38.8	▲0.2	7,508	37.3	▲3.4
Left	Elif Aralp	5,627	27.9	▲6.7	5,316	26.4	▲2.9
SPD	Niklas Kossow	2,918	14.4	▼3.0	2,598	12.9	▼3.7
CDU	Hikmet Gülmez	1,155	5.7	▼0.9	1,028	5.1	▼1.0
PARTEI	Philipp Kutz	739	3.7	▼1.7	588	2.9	▼1.6
FDP	Johannes Dalheimer	632	3.1	▲0.3	657	3.3	▲0.1
Team Todenhöfer					450	2.2	
AfD	Olaf Krüger	385	1.9	▼1.4	378	1.9	▼2.3
dieBasis	Uwe Weiß	364	1.8		315	1.6	
Klimaliste					268	1.3	
Volt					246	1.2	
Tierschutzpartei	Sunna Becker	354	1.8		237	1.2	▼0.3
du.					117	0.6	
Pirates	Franz Josef Schmitt	147	0.7	▼2.7	85	0.4	▼2.5
FW					60	0.3	
Bergpartei, die ÜberPartei					53	0.3	▼0.4
Independent	Oliver Snelinski	44	0.2				
Humanists					37	0.2	
DKP					35	0.2	▼0.3
Mieterpartei					33	0.2	
APT					29	0.1	
Gray Panthers					27	0.1	▼0.3
The Grays					21	0.1	
ÖDP					12	0.1	▼0.3
Bildet Berlin!					11	0.1	
Verjüngungsforschung					10	0.0	▼0.3
SGP					5	0.0	▼0.3
NPD					3	0.0	▼0.3
The Pinks/Alliance 21					3	0.0	
LKR					2	0.0	▼0.3
Informal votes		203			336		
Total valid votes		20,198			20,132		
Turnout		20,490	78.2	▲5.5			
Greens hold	Majority	2,206	10.9				

== See also ==
- Politics of Berlin
- House of Representatives of Berlin
