= Steglitz-Zehlendorf 2 =

State electoral district of Germany

- Electoral district for the Berlin House of Representatives
- Steglitz-Zehlendorf 2 in 2026
- District: Steglitz-Zehlendorf
- Electorate: 30,957 (2026)

Current electoral district
- Party: CDU
- Member: Tom Cywinski

Steglitz-Zehlendorf 2 is an electoral constituency (German: Wahlkreis) represented in the House of Representatives of Berlin. It elects one member via first-past-the-post voting.

== Geography ==
The constituency comprises the areas of Albrechtstraße, Steglitzer Damm, Klingsorstraße, Munsterdamm, and Halskestraße within the district of Steglitz and the borough of Steglitz-Zehlendorf.

There were 30,957 eligible voters in 2026.

== Members ==
Election	Member	Party	%
1999	Stefan Schlede	CDU	53.0
2001	Ulrike Neumann	SPD	40.7
2006	Ulrike Neumann	SPD	37.9
2011	Joachim Luchterhand	CDU	33.2
2016	Matthias Kollatz	SPD	26.8
2021	Matthias Kollatz	SPD	27.9
2023	Tom Cywinski	CDU	31.3
2026	Tom Cywinski	CDU	22.7

== Election results ==
=== 2026 election ===
State election (2026): Steglitz-Zehlendorf 2
Notes:	Blue background denotes the winner of the electorate vote. Pink background denotes a candidate elected from their party list. Yellow background denotes an electorate win by a list member, or other incumbent. A ✓ or ✗ denotes status of any incumbent, win or lose respectively.						
Party	Candidate	Votes	%	±%	Party votes	%	±%
CDU	✓ Tom Cywinski	5,361	22.7	▼8.6	5,239	22.1	▼8.0
Greens	Daniel Eliasson	4,848	20.6	▼8.6	5,239	22.1	▼8.0
SPD	Steffen Krach	4,647	19.7	▼4.4	3,914	16.5	▼5.1
Left	Franziska Brychcy	4,139	17.5	▲11.5	4,782	20.2	▲13.1
AfD	Yasmin Estenried	2,607	11.1	▲5.1	2,683	11.3	▲5.3
BSW	Jonathan Farner	789	3.3		838	3.5	
FDP	Dominique Bobeck	673	2.9	▼2.1	732	3.1	▼3.2
Volt	Carsten Jacobi	524	2.2		512	2.2	▲1.0
Tierschutzpartei					487	2.1	▼0.2
PARTEI					130	0.5	▼0.6
PdF					79	0.3	
ÖDP					44	0.2	Steady
DKP					18	0.1	Steady
du.					14	0.1	Steady
SGP					8	0.0	Steady
Informal votes		380			247		
Total valid votes		23,588			23,721		
Turnout		23,968	77.4	▲9.8			
CDU hold	Majority	513	2.1	▼5.1			

=== 2023 repeat election ===
Changes denoted below for the 2023 election are compared to the 2016 election, as the 2021 election was declared invalid.

State election (2023): Steglitz-Zehlendorf 2
Notes:	Blue background denotes the winner of the electorate vote. Pink background denotes a candidate elected from their party list. Yellow background denotes an electorate win by a list member, or other incumbent. A ✓ or ✗ denotes status of any incumbent, win or lose respectively.						
Party	Candidate	Votes	%	±%	Party votes	%	±%
CDU	Tom Jan Filip Cywinski	6,447	31.3	▲7.4	6,203	30.1	▲8.3
SPD	✗ Matthias Kollatz	4,972	24.1	▼2.7	4,460	21.6	▼1.9
Greens	Tonka Wojahn	4,577	22.2	▲2.3	4,280	20.7	▲2.4
Left	Franziska Brychcy	1,245	6.0	▼1.3	1,450	7.0	▼1.5
AfD	Matthias Pawlik	1,229	6.0	▼5.0	1,232	6.0	▼5.2
FDP	Thomas Seerig	1,021	5.0	▼2.9	1,306	6.3	▼2.3
Tierschutzpartei	Sigrid Tamara Schalge	569	2.8		463	2.2	▲0.3
PARTEI	Christian Jörg Grabert	310	1.5		238	1.2	▼0.4
Volt					230	1.1	
Team Todenhöfer					101	0.5	
dieBasis	Andreas Opitz-Greenfield	119	0.6		84	0.4	
The Grays					82	0.4	
Gray Panthers					77	0.4	▼0.5
Pirates					59	0.3	▼1.7
Humanists					58	0.3	
Mieterpartei					56	0.3	
FW	Andreas Diezmann	108	0.5		47	0.2	
Verjüngungsforschung					41	0.2	▼0.2
Klimaliste					37	0.2	
ÖDP					32	0.2	
du.					22	0.1	
Bildet Berlin!					17	0.1	
The Pinks/Alliance 21					16	0.1	
DKP					14	0.1	Steady
Bergpartei, die ÜberPartei					10	0.0	
NPD					8	0.0	▼0.2
SGP					8	0.0	Steady
LKR					5	0.0	▼0.4
BüSo					3	0.0	▼0.1
Informal votes		174			139		
Total valid votes		20,597			20,639		
Turnout		20,796	67.6	▼3.1			
CDU gain from SPD	Majority	1,475	7.2				

=== 2021 election (annulled) ===
The election in 2021 was annulled and rerun in 2023.

State election (2021): Steglitz-Zehlendorf 2
Notes:	Blue background denotes the winner of the electorate vote. Pink background denotes a candidate elected from their party list. Yellow background denotes an electorate win by a list member, or other incumbent. A ✓ or ✗ denotes status of any incumbent, win or lose respectively.						
Party	Candidate	Votes	%	±%	Party votes	%	±%
SPD	✓ Matthias Kollatz	6,519	27.9	▲1.0	5,941	24.4	▲0.8
Greens	Tonka Wojahn	5,212	22.3	▲2.4	5,185	21.3	▲2.9
CDU	Tom Jan Filip Cywinski	4,937	21.1	▼2.8	4,871	20.0	▼1.8
FDP	Thomas Seerig	1,880	8.1	▲0.2	2,249	9.2	▲0.6
Left	Franziska Brychcy	1,617	6.9	▼0.4	1,969	8.1	▼0.5
AfD	Matthias Pawlik	1,286	5.5	▼5.5	1,356	5.6	▼5.6
Tierschutzpartei	Sigrid Tamara Schalge	786	3.4		526	2.2	▲0.2
PARTEI	Christian Jörg Grabert	468	2.0		341	1.4	▼0.1
dieBasis	Andreas Opitz-Greenfield	364	1.6		295	1.2	
Volt					287	1.2	
Team Todenhöfer					244	1.0	
FW	Andreas Diezmann	276	1.2		175	0.7	
The Grays					133	0.5	
APT					115	0.5	
Pirates					109	0.4	▼1.5
Gray Panthers					100	0.4	▼0.5
Klimaliste					80	0.3	
Humanists					71	0.3	
Verjüngungsforschung					60	0.2	▼0.2
Mieterpartei					52	0.2	
ÖDP					47	0.2	
Bildet Berlin!					45	0.2	
du.					37	0.2	
Bergpartei, die ÜberPartei					14	0.1	
NPD					14	0.1	▼0.2
The Pinks/Alliance 21					14	0.1	
DKP					10	0.0	Steady
LKR					7	0.0	▼0.4
BüSo					6	0.0	▼0.1
SGP					6	0.0	▼0.1
Informal votes		1,090			247		
Total valid votes		23,345			24,359		
Turnout		24,641	79.4	▲8.7			
SPD hold	Majority	1,307	5.6				

== See also ==
- Politics of Berlin
- House of Representatives of Berlin
