= Pankow 6 =

State electoral district of Germany

- Electoral district for the Berlin House of Representatives
- Pankow 6 in 2026
- District: Pankow
- Electorate: 32,268 (2026)

Current electoral district
- Party: The Left
- Member: Maria Bigos

Pankow 6 is an electoral constituency (German: Wahlkreis) represented in the House of Representatives of Berlin. It elects one member via first-past-the-post voting.

== Geography ==
The constituency comprises the areas of Esplanade, Schönhauser Allee, Prenzlauer Allee, Danziger Straße, Eberswalder Straße, S-Bahn line between Schönhauser Allee and Prenzlauer Allee, and the Mitte district boundary within the borough of Pankow.

There were 32,268 eligible voters in 2026.

== Members ==
Election	Member	Party	%
2006	Andreas Otto	Green	34.3
2011	Andreas Otto	Green	35.1
2016	Andreas Otto	Green	36.5
2021	Andreas Otto	Green	41.3
2023	Andreas Otto	Green	41.7
2026	Maria Bigos	Left	32.4

== Election results ==
=== 2026 election ===
State election (2026): Pankow 6
Notes:	Blue background denotes the winner of the electorate vote. Pink background denotes a candidate elected from their party list. Yellow background denotes an electorate win by a list member, or other incumbent. A ✓ or ✗ denotes status of any incumbent, win or lose respectively.						
Party	Candidate	Votes	%	±%	Party votes	%	±%
Left	Maria Bigos	8,593	32.4	▲14.2	9,385	35.3	▲16.2
Greens	Sunčica Klaas	8,096	30.6	▼11.1	7,246	27.3	▼10.5
SPD	Linda Vierecke	3,818	14.4	▲0.5	2,728	10.3	▼2.9
CDU	Stephan Lenz	2,520	9.5	▼2.7	2,835	10.7	▼1.4
AfD	Christoph Schweer	1,410	5.3	▲1.9	1,435	5.4	▲1.9
Volt	Aiga Senftleben	882	3.3		963	3.6	▲1.7
BSW	Frank Barsch	744	2.8		804	3.0	
FDP	Ruven Gastel	424	1.6	▼2.4	459	1.7	▼2.6
Tierschutzpartei					302	1.1	▼0.6
PARTEI					232	0.9	▼1.2
PdF					73	0.3	
DKP					44	0.2	▼0.1
ÖDP					37	0.1	Steady
du.					18	0.1	▼0.2
SGP					9	0.0	Steady
Informal votes		205			122		
Total valid votes		26,487			26,570		
Turnout		26,692	82.7	▲11.8			
Left gain from Greens	Majority	497	1.8				

=== 2023 repeat election ===
Changes denoted below for the 2023 election are compared to the 2016 election, as the 2021 election was declared invalid.

State election (2023): Pankow 6
Notes:	Blue background denotes the winner of the electorate vote. Pink background denotes a candidate elected from their party list. Yellow background denotes an electorate win by a list member, or other incumbent. A ✓ or ✗ denotes status of any incumbent, win or lose respectively.						
Party	Candidate	Votes	%	±%	Party votes	%	±%
Greens	✓ Andreas Otto	8,943	41.6	▲5.1	8,154	37.8	▲6.0
Left	Katja Rom	3,927	18.3	▼2.2	4,131	19.1	▼2.2
SPD	Linda Vierecke	2,990	13.9	▼3.5	2,849	13.2	▼5.0
CDU	Stephan Lenz	2,633	12.3	▲3.3	2,614	12.1	▲3.3
FDP	Thomas Enge	851	4.0	▲0.3	936	4.3	▼0.7
AfD	Tobias Thieme	730	3.4	▼2.0	758	3.5	▼2.3
PARTEI	Constantin Lissner	555	2.6	▼0.4	441	2.0	▼1.2
Volt					415	1.9	
Tierschutzpartei	Katharin Maria Hübner	456	2.1		380	1.8	▲0.5
dieBasis	Wilfried Meyer	245	1.1		202	0.9	
Klimaliste					123	0.6	
Pirates					75	0.3	▼2.6
Mieterpartei					66	0.3	
du.	Fabian Blume	103	0.5		65	0.3	
The Grays					48	0.2	
DKP					47	0.2	▼0.1
Humanists					41	0.2	
Gray Panthers					37	0.2	▼0.2
FW					35	0.2	
Bergpartei, die ÜberPartei					32	0.1	
Team Todenhöfer					32	0.1	
ÖDP	Thomas Georg Kuhn	44	0.2		29	0.1	
Verjüngungsforschung					20	0.1	▼0.2
Bildet Berlin!					18	0.1	
SGP					10	0.0	▼0.1
The Pinks/Alliance 21					9	0.0	
NPD					8	0.0	▼0.1
BüSo					4	0.0	Steady
LKR					3	0.0	▼0.2
Informal votes		21,477			21,582		
Total valid votes		170			79		
Turnout		21,675	71.0	▼2.7			
Greens hold	Majority	5,016	23.3				

=== 2021 election (annulled) ===
The election in 2021 was annulled and rerun in 2023.

State election (2021): Pankow 6
Notes:	Blue background denotes the winner of the electorate vote. Pink background denotes a candidate elected from their party list. Yellow background denotes an electorate win by a list member, or other incumbent. A ✓ or ✗ denotes status of any incumbent, win or lose respectively.						
Party	Candidate	Votes	%	±%	Party votes	%	±%
Greens	✓ Andreas Otto	10,451	41.3	▲4.8	9,620	37.7	▲6.0
Left	Katja Rom	5,247	20.8	▲0.3	5,595	21.9	▲0.5
SPD	Linda Vierecke	3,759	14.9	▼2.5	3,313	13.0	▼5.2
CDU	Stephan Lenz	1,854	7.3	▼1.6	1,751	6.9	▼1.9
FDP	Thomas Enge	1,326	5.2	▲1.5	1,449	5.7	▲0.7
PARTEI	Constantin Lissner	719	2.8	▼0.1	598	2.3	▼0.9
AfD	Tobias Thieme	658	2.6	▼2.8	702	2.8	▼3.0
Volt					639	2.5	
dieBasis	Wilfried Meyer	483	1.9		434	1.7	
Tierschutzpartei	Katharin Maria Hübner	443	1.8		301	1.2	▼0.1
Klimaliste					240	0.9	
FW		165	0.7		124	0.5	
Pirates					115	0.5	▼2.5
The Grays					75	0.3	
Humanists					74	0.3	
Mieterpartei					72	0.3	
Die Urbane Eine HipHop Partei	Fabian Blume	100	0.4		67	0.3	
Team Todenhöfer					63	0.2	
Bergpartei, die ÜberPartei					44	0.2	
Gray Panthers					42	0.2	▼0.2
Verjüngungsforschung					35	0.1	▼0.2
DKP					34	0.1	▼0.2
Bildet Berlin!					33	0.1	
ÖDP	Thomas Georg Kuhn	73	0.3		32	0.1	
APT					29	0.1	
SGP					11	0.0	▼0.1
The Pinks/Alliance 21					8	0.0	
BüSo					6	0.0	Steady
LKR					6	0.0	▼0.2
NPD					4	0.0	▼0.1
Informal votes		296			98		
Total valid votes		25,278			25,516		
Turnout		25,637	83.7	▲10.1			
Greens hold	Majority	5,204	20.5				

== See also ==
- Politics of Berlin
- House of Representatives of Berlin
