= Friedrichshain-Kreuzberg 1 =

State electoral district of Germany

- Electoral district for the Berlin House of Representatives
- Friedrichshain-Kreuzberg 1 in 2026
- District: Friedrichshain-Kreuzberg
- Electorate: 32,832 (2026)

Current electoral district
- Party: The Left
- Member: Elif Eralp

Friedrichshain-Kreuzberg 1 is an electoral constituency (German: Wahlkreis) represented in the House of Representatives of Berlin. It elects one member via first-past-the-post voting.

== Geography ==
The constituency comprises the areas of Askanischer Platz, West Mehringplatz Lindenstr./Axel-Springer-Str., Gleisdreieck, Rathaus Yorckstraße, West Urbanstraße, Zossener Str., Viktoriapark, and Chamissokiez within the borough of Friedrichshain-Kreuzberg.

There were 32,832 eligible voters in 2026.

== Members ==
Election	Member	Party	%
1995	Kurt Wansner	CDU	30.2
1999	Kurt Wansner	CDU	31.7
2001	Peter Strieder	SPD	37.9
2006	Heidi Kosche	Green	40.2
2011	Heidi Kosche	Green	43.8
2016	Katrin Schmidberger	Green	44.1
2021	Katrin Schmidberger	Green	41.3
2023	Katrin Schmidberger	Green	40.3
2026	Elif Eralp	Left	50.4

== Election results ==
=== 2026 election ===
State election (2026): Friedrichshain-Kreuzberg 1
Notes:	Blue background denotes the winner of the electorate vote. Pink background denotes a candidate elected from their party list. Yellow background denotes an electorate win by a list member, or other incumbent. A ✓ or ✗ denotes status of any incumbent, win or lose respectively.						
Party	Candidate	Votes	%	±%	Party votes	%	±%
Left	Elif Eralp	11,185	50.4	▲32.5	10,434	46.9	▲27.4
Greens	Kübra Beydaș	3,817	17.2	▼14.0	3,980	17.9	▼11.2
SPD	Sevim Aydin	2,353	10.6	▼9.0	2,235	10.1	▼6.4
CDU	Kurt Wansner	1,661	7.5	▼10.5	1,783	8.0	▼9.0
AfD	Gerhard Zaucker	1,209	5.4	▲2.3	1,217	5.5	▲2.1
BSW	Manaf Hassan	921	4.2		1,193	5.4	
Volt	Jakob Welker	359	1.6		422	1.9	▲0.8
FDP	Jörg Höhn	311	1.4	▼1.5	348	1.6	▼1.4
PARTEI	Riza Cörtlen	258	1.2	▼2.0	202	0.9	▼1.2
MERA25	Jaroslav Toussaint	58	0.3				
Feminist Party of Germany	Sigrid Werner	57	0.3				
DKP					40	0.2	▼0.4
du.					34	0.2	▼0.4
PdF					31	0.1	
SGP					11	0.0	▼0.1
Bergpartei, die ÜberPartei					10	0.0	▼0.2
ÖDP					8	0.0	▼0.1
Informal votes		326			290		
Total valid votes		22,189			22,225		
Turnout		22,515	68.6	▲13.5			
Left gain from Greens	Majority	7,368	33.2				

=== 2023 repeat election ===
Changes denoted below for the 2023 election are compared to the 2016 election, as the 2021 election was declared invalid.

State election (2023): Friedrichshain-Kreuzberg 1
Notes:	Blue background denotes the winner of the electorate vote. Pink background denotes a candidate elected from their party list. Yellow background denotes an electorate win by a list member, or other incumbent. A ✓ or ✗ denotes status of any incumbent, win or lose respectively.						
Party	Candidate	Votes	%	±%	Party votes	%	±%
Greens	✓ Katrin Schmidberger	7,422	40.3	▲1.7	6,822	37.0	▲4.9
SPD	Hannah Sophie Lupper	3,161	17.2	▼4.5	2,963	16.1	▼4.0
Left	Gabriele Helena Anna Gottwald	2,849	15.5	▼1.5	3,206	17.4	▼1.6
CDU	Timur Husein	2,814	15.3	▲6.0	2,629	14.3	▲5.9
FDP	Bernd Schlömer	617	3.4	▼0.9	692	3.8	▼0.8
PARTEI	Jan-Hendrik Birkner	533	2.9	▼0.9	343	1.9	▼1.3
AfD	Frank Scheermesser	453	2.5	▲1.1	484	2.6	▼2.7
Tierschutzpartei	Benjamin Gold	370	2.0		273	1.5	▲0.1
Volt					248	1.3	
Klimaliste					150	0.8	
dieBasis	Marina Krug	189	1.0		131	0.7	
Team Todenhöfer					114	0.6	
du.					71	0.4	
Pirates					56	0.3	▼2.0
Mieterpartei					47	0.3	
Gray Panthers					34	0.2	▼0.3
Humanists					24	0.1	
The Grays					22	0.1	
Verjüngungsforschung					21	0.1	▼0.2
Bergpartei, die ÜberPartei					21	0.1	▼0.4
FW					21	0.1	
DKP					19	0.1	▼0.2
ÖDP					15	0.1	▼0.2
The Pinks/Alliance 21					14	0.1	
Bildet Berlin!					12	0.1	
SGP					9	0.0	▼0.3
LKR					3	0.0	▼0.3
BüSo					2	0.0	▼0.2
NPD					2	0.0	▼0.3
Informal votes		118			88		
Total valid votes		18,408			18,448		
Turnout		18,547	64.3	▼5.8			
Greens hold	Majority	4,261	23.1				

=== 2021 election (annulled) ===
The election in 2021 was annulled and rerun in 2023.

State election (2021): Friedrichshain-Kreuzberg 1
Notes:	Blue background denotes the winner of the electorate vote. Pink background denotes a candidate elected from their party list. Yellow background denotes an electorate win by a list member, or other incumbent. A ✓ or ✗ denotes status of any incumbent, win or lose respectively.						
Party	Candidate	Votes	%	±%	Party votes	%	±%
Greens	✓ Katrin Schmidberger	9,153	41.2	▲2.5	8,117	36.3	▲4.3
SPD	Hannah Sophie Lupper	4,143	18.6	▼3.0	3,769	16.9	▼3.2
Left	Gabriele Helena Anna Gottwald	3,657	16.5	▼0.5	4,284	19.2	▲0.2
CDU	Timur Husein	2,103	9.5	▲0.2	1,860	8.3	Steady
FDP	Bernd Schlömer	1,082	4.9	▲0.7	1,115	5.0	▲0.5
PARTEI	Jan-Hendrik Birkner	706	3.2	▼0.6	499	2.2	▼1.0
AfD	Frank Scheermesser	483	2.2	▲0.8	500	2.2	▼3.1
Team Todenhöfer					455	2.0	
Volt					367	1.6	
Tierschutzpartei	Benjamin Gold	457	2.1		254	1.1	▼0.3
dieBasis	Marina Krug	439	2.0		331	1.5	
Klimaliste					231	1.0	
FW					97	0.4	
Pirates					76	0.3	▼2.0
du.					74	0.3	
APT					44	0.2	
Mieterpartei					44	0.2	
The Grays					42	0.2	
Humanists					41	0.2	
Gray Panthers					36	0.2	▼0.4
Bergpartei, die ÜberPartei					29	0.1	▼0.3
ÖDP					23	0.1	▼0.2
DKP					23	0.1	▼0.2
Bildet Berlin!					17	0.1	
Verjüngungsforschung					16	0.1	▼0.3
SGP					6	0.0	▼0.3
LKR					5	0.0	▼0.3
NPD					5	0.0	▼0.3
The Pinks/Alliance 21					4	0.0	
BüSo					2	0.0	▼0.2
Informal votes		316			162		
Total valid votes		22,223			22,366		
Turnout		22,539	78.0	▲7.9			
Greens hold	Majority	5,010	22.6				

== See also ==
- Politics of Berlin
- House of Representatives of Berlin
