= Wojahn =

Wojahn is a surname. Notable people with the surname include:

- David Wojahn (born 1953), American poet
- R. Lorraine Wojahn (1920–2012), American politician
- Tonka Wojahn (born 1975), Bulgarian-born German politician
