= United Palestinian National Committee =

Radical Pro-Palestinian and anti-Israel group in Berlin, Germany

Vereinigtes Palästinensisches Nationalkomitee
- United Palestinian National Committee
- Formation: 2024; 2 years ago
- Founder: Ibrahim Ibrahim
- Founded at: Neukölln, Berlin, Germany
- Type: non-formal organization
- Headquarters: Neukölln
- Origins: Palästinensische Gemeinschaft in Deutschland e. V. (PGD)
- Methods: demonstrations
- Members: 250
- Official language: Arabic, German
- Website: {

United Palestinian National Committee (Vereinigtes Palästinensisches Nationalkomitee, VPNK) is an umbrella term in Berlin, Germany and according to German authorthies an organizing structure which supports the Islamist Hamas and the secular Popular Front for the Liberation of Palestine (PFLP). The VPNK acts as an main organizer of most "pro-Palestinian" and anti-Israel demonstrations in Berlin.

Ibrahim Ibrahim is spokesperosn of VPNK and acts as a representative for militant Palestinian organizations in Germany.

== Work ==
"Free Palstine" demonstration at Kottbusser Damm in 2023, circeld Ibrahim Ibrahim of Ibrahim of VPNK

The organization first emerged as a structured entity in 2024 following the 2023 Hamas terrorist attack on Israel. It specifically targets the large Arab community in Berlin, particularly the Palestinian community, and most notably in the district of Neukölln through communications in the Arabic language. Any ties to, or support for, Hamas or the PFLP are generally concealed from public view. The Berlin Senate Department for the Interior estimates the total number of individuals involved in VPNK at around 230 people. The organiszation is most exclusively active in Berlin.

The VPNK serves as a connecting link between Islamist and secular extremism. It cooperates with other anti-Israeli actors such as local BDS campaign activist, the group "Young Struggle", and former activists from the banned network Samidoun. Also VPNK is part of the so-called "Internationalist Alliance" of Berlin.

The Neukölln district branch of the party "Die Linke" (The Left) collaborates, indirectly but consistently with the VPNK via the "Internationalist Alliance." In August 2025, Felix Klein, the German federal government’s commissioner for the prevention of antisemitism, criticized this cooperation. He stated that anyone wishing to highlight and denounce human suffering, while failing to distance themselves from the most heinous terrorist groups, undermines their own credibility.

== See also ==
- Ibrahim Ibrahim (political activist)
- Vanessa Emde
