= Ibrahim Ibrahim =

Ibrahim Ibrahim may refer to:

- Ibrahim Ibrahim (bishop) (born 1962), Canadian bishop
- Ibrahim Ibrahim (economist), Qatari economist
- Ibrahim Ibrahim (political activist)
- I. M. Ibrahim (1941–2008), head coach of the Clemson University men's soccer team
- Ibrahim Namo Ibrahim (born 1937), bishop of the Catholic Church in the United States
- Ibrahim Sabawi Ibrahim (1981–2015), Saddam Hussein's half-nephew and an ISIL guerrilla
