= Elif Eralp =

German lawyer and politician (born 1981)

Elif Eralp MdA
- Eralp in October 2026

Leader of The Left in the Abgeordnetenhaus of Berlin
- Incumbent
- Assumed office 22 September 2026 Serving with Tobias Schulze
- Preceded by: Anne Helm

Member of the Abgeordnetenhaus of Berlin
- Incumbent
- Assumed office 4 November 2021
- Constituency: Friedrichshain-Kreuzberg 1 (since 2026)

Personal details
- Born: 14 January 1981 (age 45) Munich, West Germany
- Party: Die Linke (since 2017)
- Children: 2
- Parent: Hülya Eralp (mother)
- Education: University of Hamburg
- Occupation: Lawyer; politician

Elif Eralp (German pronunciation: [ˈeːlɪf ˈɛʁalp]; born 14 January 1981) is a German lawyer and politician of Die Linke who has been a member of the Berlin House of Representatives since November 2021. She has served as co-leader of the parliamentary group since 2026, and as deputy state chair of the party since 2025.

Eralp was born in Munich to parents who had fled Turkey after the military coup of September 1980 and claimed asylum in West Germany. She studied law at the University of Hamburg, passed both German state examinations in law, and worked from 2010 to 2021 as a legal policy adviser to Die Linke's parliamentary group in the Bundestag. Her political work has focused on anti-racism, anti-discrimination and housing policy.

She was Die Linke's lead candidate in the 2026 Berlin state election, in which the party took 25.7 per cent of the list vote and won 47 of the 158 seats, becoming the largest party in the House of Representatives for the first time. Because the Governing Mayor of Berlin is elected by the House of Representatives, Eralp has been widely named as a candidate for the office. Die Linke invited the Greens and the SPD to exploratory talks the day after the election, and a Christian Democrat-led coalition under Stefan Evers also remained arithmetically possible.

== Early life and education ==
Eralp's family comes from the village of Panlı in Pınarbaşı, Kayseri, the hometown of her father, Selçuk Eralp. Her parents, who were politically active trade unionists in Turkey, fled to West Germany due to political persecution following the 1980 Turkish coup d'état. Her mother, Hülya Eralp, who was born in Adana, had been elected to the central committee of a socialist workers' party in Istanbul in 1979 and was organising textile workers for the DİSK union federation; after the coup the couple went into hiding, left Turkey on 13 November 1980 and applied for asylum on arrival in Munich, where Eralp was born on 14 January 1981. She grew up in Dortmund, where her father worked as a doctor and her mother studied social pedagogy at evening classes. At the age of eight, the family moved to Altona, Hamburg, where she completed her schooling.

After graduating from high school, Eralp studied law at the University of Hamburg from 2001 to 2007, specializing in criminology and spending a semester at the University of Alicante in Spain. She completed her studies with the First State Examination in law. She then completed her legal traineeship, which included placements at the Hamburg and Hamburg-Altona local courts, Fuhlsbüttel prison, the UN High Commissioner for Refugees in Berlin, the German Embassy in Ottawa, and a law firm specializing in immigration and asylum law. In 2009, she completed her legal training with the Second State Examination in Law in Hamburg.

== Political career ==
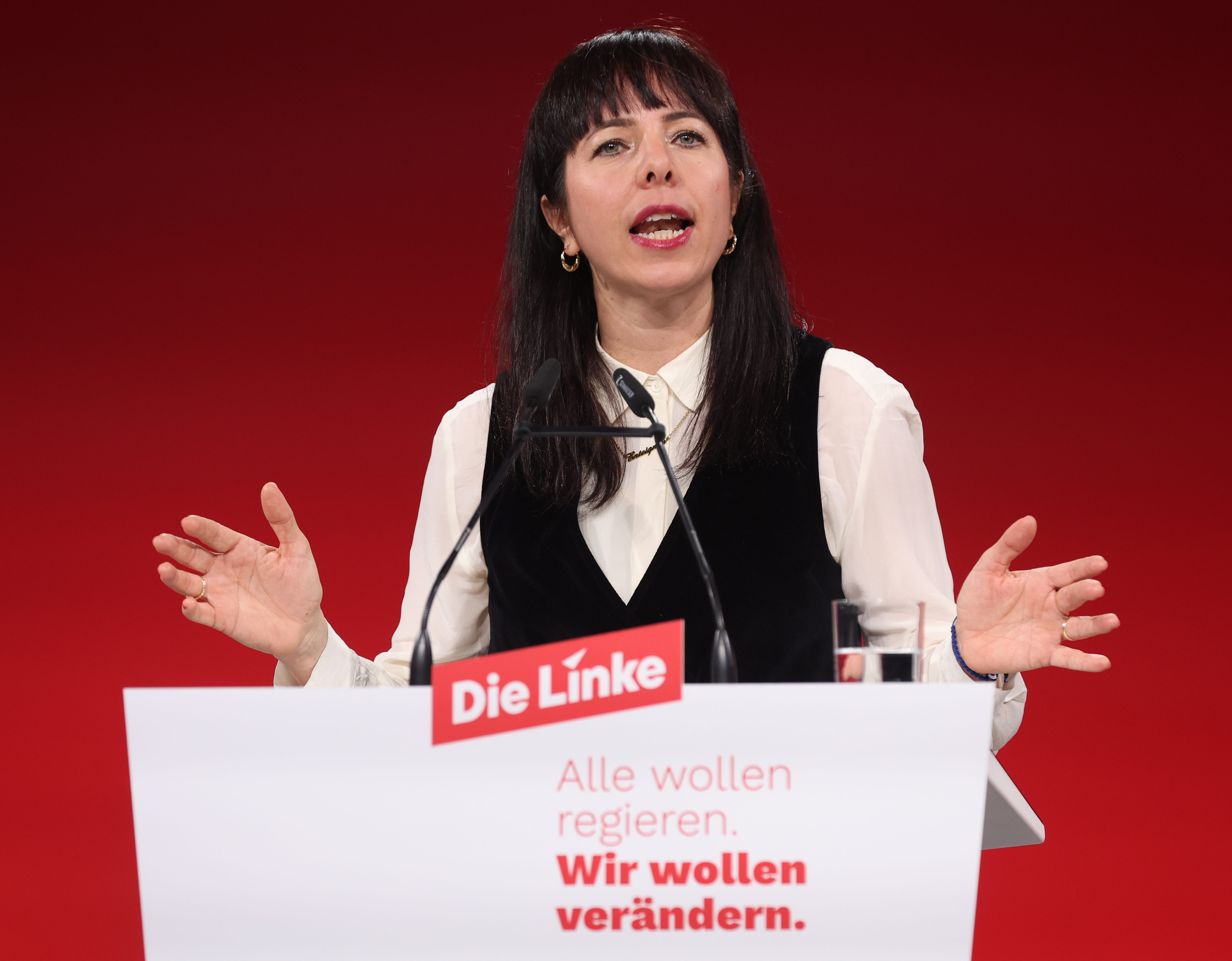
Eralp speaks at an extraordinary party conference of Die Linke in Berlin, 18 January 2025

Eralp has been politically active since her youth, including environmental activism and supporting Castor transport blockades in the Wendland region and at Gorleben. In 2010 she moved to Berlin, where she worked until 2021 as a legal policy adviser to the Civil Rights and Democracy working group of Die Linke's parliamentary group. During the same period she sat on the group's works council and on the collective bargaining commission of the Ver.di trade union. Describing Kreuzberg as her political home, she was active there in initiatives against racism and gentrification and for affordable housing for all. Among other things, she was involved in the migrant association Allmende e.V., which was itself forced to leave its premises on Kottbusser Damm because of rising rents.

Eralp joined the party in 2017, saying she believed parliaments needed a party that offered an alternative to neoliberal politics and stood against the racism of the AfD. She was first elected to the state executive committee at the 7th state party conference of the Berlin state association in December 2018 and served until 2023, and was first elected deputy state chair at the 10th state party conference in May 2025. In the House of Representatives she has chaired the urban development committee and served as her party's spokeswoman on migration and anti-discrimination policy.

In mid-2019, Eralp, together with her state executive committee colleagues Hamze Bytyci, Ferat Koçak, and Belma Bekos, founded the nationwide alliance Links*Kanax, which advocates, among other things, for greater inclusion of party members who have experienced racism. The alliance campaigned successfully for a decision to set up a volunteer anti-discrimination office for those who experience discrimination within the party, although Eralp said in 2025 that this and other proposals, including a diversity survey and a mentoring programme, were still awaiting implementation. Eralp and her colleagues also championed a diversity committee to develop strategies and concepts for organizing and engaging more people with a migrant background within the party.

In 2021, the Berlin branch of Die Linke nominated Eralp for a direct mandate in the Friedrichshain-Kreuzberg 2 constituency and for the promising seventh spot on the state list for the 2021 Berlin state election. One of the goals of the state party and its chairwoman, Katina Schubert, was to include "new faces" among the top ten candidates on the list. Eralp cited the far-right extremist Hanau shootings in 2020 as one of her motivations for running. Various media outlets reported on Eralp's door-to-door campaigning in her constituency, which has a large immigrant population. Although she lost to incumbent Green candidate Marianne Burkert-Eulitz with 28.5% of the vote against 38.5%, through the state list she was nevertheless able to enter the Berlin House of Representatives, where she joined Die Linke's faction. At the repeat election in 2023 she took 27.1% of the first vote in her constituency and kept her seat.

=== 2026 state election ===
On 9 October 2025 the Berlin state executive of Die Linke unanimously nominated Eralp as the party's lead candidate for the state election of 20 September 2026 and as its candidate for Governing Mayor. The party built its campaign largely around Eralp personally and ran an extensive door-to-door canvassing operation; in spring 2026 it brought in Morris Katz, a strategist who had worked on Zohran Mamdani's New York campaign, as an adviser. Support for Die Linke and the left was also mobilised by the recent AfD victory in the 2026 Saxony-Anhalt state election. Rent and housing policy were at the centre of the campaign: Eralp said one of her first acts in office would be a rent cap, and the party made its entry into government conditional on implementing the 2021 Deutsche Wohnen & Co. enteignen referendum on expropriating large housing companies. She also argued that the AfD should be banned.

Two controversies arose during the campaign. At an event organized by the party's Neukölln district association in late August 2026, a rapper performing a song about the war in Gaza used the line "death to the Israeli army". Eralp and state chair Kerstin Wolter condemned the performance in the strongest terms. Eralp said she was appalled, and that those responsible should have intervened at once. At a discussion held by Berlin's Jewish Community on 9 September 2026 she said that antisemitism was a problem for society as a whole and existed within Die Linke as well, but that the large majority of the party supported the protection of Jewish life. She added that she expected the Neukölln incident to be investigated and to have consequences.

Eralp at the closing rally in front of the Red City Hall, two days before the election

At the election on 20 September 2026 Die Linke took 25.7% of the list vote, a gain of 13.4 percentage points on 2023, and won 47 of the 158 seats. It became the largest party in the House of Representatives for the first time in its history. The CDU took 18.8%, the AfD 16.3%, the Greens 14.3% and the SPD 12.1%, the SPD's worst recorded result in Berlin; the Sahra Wagenknecht Alliance fell below the threshold on 4.7% and turnout was 74.2%. Eralp won the Friedrichshain-Kreuzberg 1 constituency on the first vote, entering the House as a directly elected member.

On election night Eralp said the mandate to form a government fell to her party and that it would not retreat on expropriation, declaring that "if Die Linke governs, expropriation will happen". The following day Die Linke invited the Greens and the SPD to exploratory talks. Both a Left–Green–SPD coalition and a CDU–Green–SPD coalition were arithmetically possible, and the CDU lead candidate Stefan Evers was named alongside Eralp as a possible Governing Mayor. SPD lead candidate Steffen Krach and Green lead candidate Werner Graf said they expected an explicit commitment against antisemitism from Die Linke as a condition of any coalition. Eralp replied that the party's promise of protection applied to Muslims and Christians as well as Jews, and to everyone in the city.

=== Coalition Negotiations ===
At the end of October, the process of forming a government began in Berlin. The Left Party, Alliance 90/The Greens, and the SPD entered into coalition negotiations. Key points in this regard include housing construction and socialization, financial consolidation, administrative modernization, and education (including free school lunches).

==== Der Spiegel interview ====
In October 2026, a heated debate played out in the media regarding Eralp's capacity to govern—a point strongly called into question by the political opposition. Der Spiegel magazine contributed significantly to this with a cover story, publishing an unauthorized interview with Eralp, which sparked criticism about how Der Spiegel handles confidential information.

In the interview with Der Spiegel, Eralp confirmed that one of the campaign incidents she was referring to was the appearance of Ibrahim Ibrahim, a controversial radical Palestinian activist associated with the Popular Front for the Liberation of Palestine (considered a terrorist organization by the European Union), at the Die Linke election-night party in Neukölln. When her office returned the transcript to the magazine the question and her answer had been deleted. The document also contained internal comments in which Eralp wrote that she could not put herself and her family in danger for the magazine. Der Spiegel published the information against Eralp's wishes, despite a prior agreement that the interview would be subject to authorization. Eralp declined to comment on the details of the incident. She said she will fight "against organized crime, against organizations that glorify violence, against violence, against terror".

Politicians from various parties and other journalists have criticized the news magazine's approach.

== Personal life ==
Eralp is married and a mother of two children.
