= Ibrahim Ibrahim (political activist) =

German-Palestinian political activist

- Born: January 14, 1956 (age 70); Lebanon
- Occupation: militant Palestinian activist
- Spouse: 1

Ibrahim Ibrahim (born January 14, 1956) is a Palestinian-German activist living in Berlin. He serves as a representative for militant Palestinian organizations in Germany. He is spokesperson for the "United Palestinian National Committee (VPNK)" in Berlin.

Ibrahim Ibrahim appeared at the Die Linke (Left Party's) celebration in Neukölln following their victory in the 2026 Berlin election. His connections to MPs Ferat Koçak and Vanessa Emde, along with references to the influence exerted on him by Elif Eralp, brought him nationwide attention.

== Life ==
Ibrahim Ibrahim was born in January 1956. According to media reports, he likely grew up in a Palestinian refugee camp in Lebanon. Later he came to Germany and got German citizenship.

He serves as the face and spokesperson for the "United Palestinian National Committee (VPNK)" in Berlin. VPNK is an umbrella group of Palestinian associations in Germany. According to German authorities, it acts as an overarching organization for the secular Popular Front for the Liberation of Palestine (PFLP) and structures affiliated with Hamas.

Members of the PFLP took part in the massacre of October 7, 2023, in Israel. Ibrahim Ibrahim referred to the mastermind Hamas leader Yahya Sinwar as a "martyr hero" to whom he paid his "deep respect."

Ibrahim Ibrahim was present at the election party held by the Berlin branch of The Left (Die Linke) on September 20, 2026. He posed for selfies with Bundestag member Ferat Koçak and Vanessa Emde, a MP who had just been elected to the House of Representatives.

In a statement for the daily newspaper Junge Welt from mid-October 2026, Ibrahim Ibrahim rejected the accusation of supporting terrorism.

Also in October 2026, the news magazine Der Spiegel conducted an interview with mayoral candidate Elif Eralp (The Left Party). During the authorization process for the interview, Eralp requested the removal of a question concerning VPNK representative Ibrahim Ibrahim. Nevertheless, the magazine published the interview and her notes. This triggered a discussion not only regarding potential bias on the part of Eralp, but also concerning Der Spiegel's conduct, which was in violation of press ethic.

In November 2026, the Berlin police searched the apartment of Ibrahim Ibrahim son in Berlin-Tiergarten, looking for illegal weapons.
