= Taylan Kurt =

German politician (born 1988)

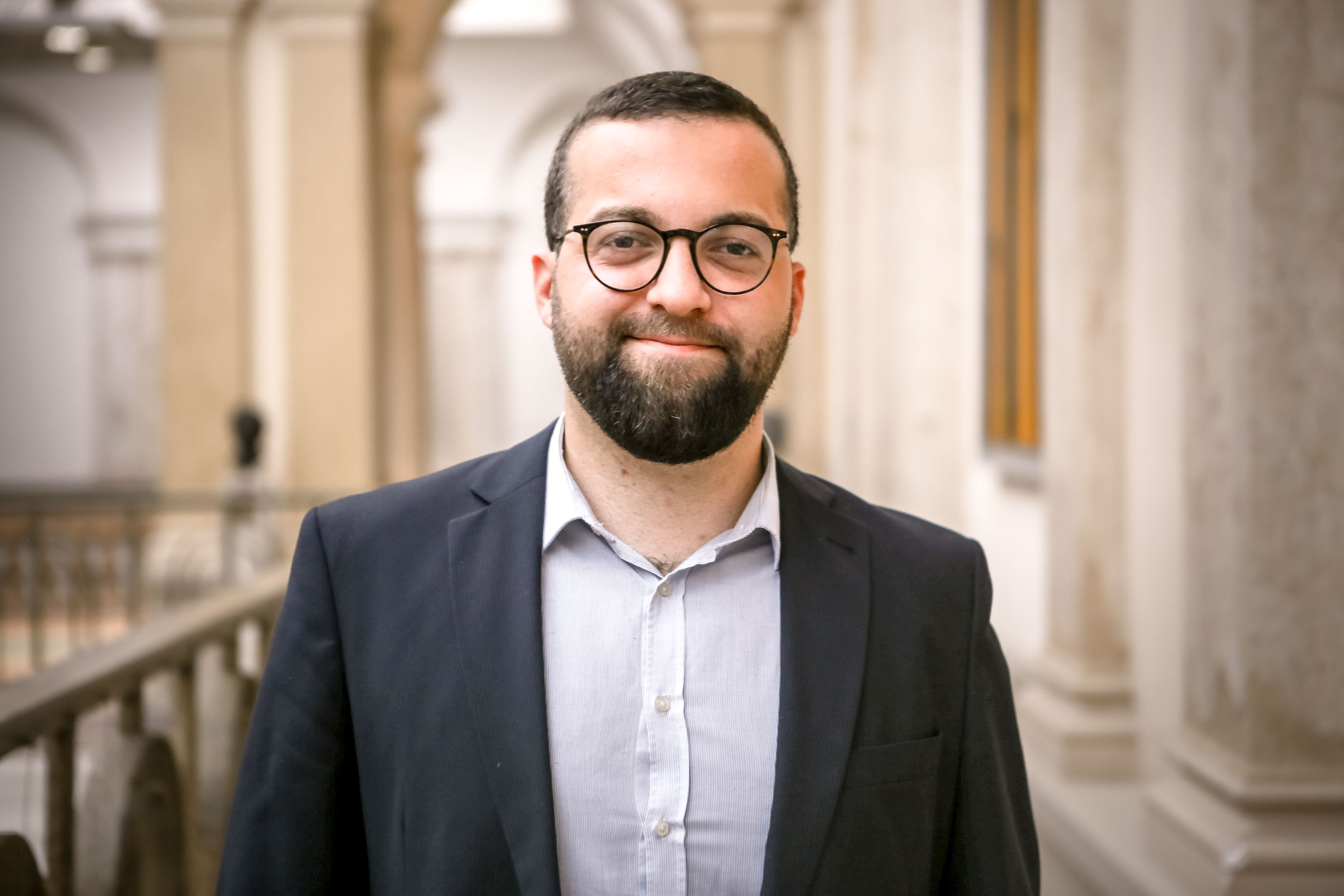
- Kurt in 2021

Member of the Berlin House of Representatives
- Incumbent
- Assumed office 4 November 2021
- Preceded by: Marc Urbatsch
- Constituency: Mitte 4

Personal details
- Born: 1988 (age 37–38)
- Party: Alliance 90/The Greens (since 2011)

Taylan Kurt (born 1988) is a German politician serving as a member of the Berlin House of Representatives since 2021. From 2016 to 2021, he was a borough councillor of Mitte. He is of Kurdish descent.
