= Tonka Wojahn =

German politician (born 1975)

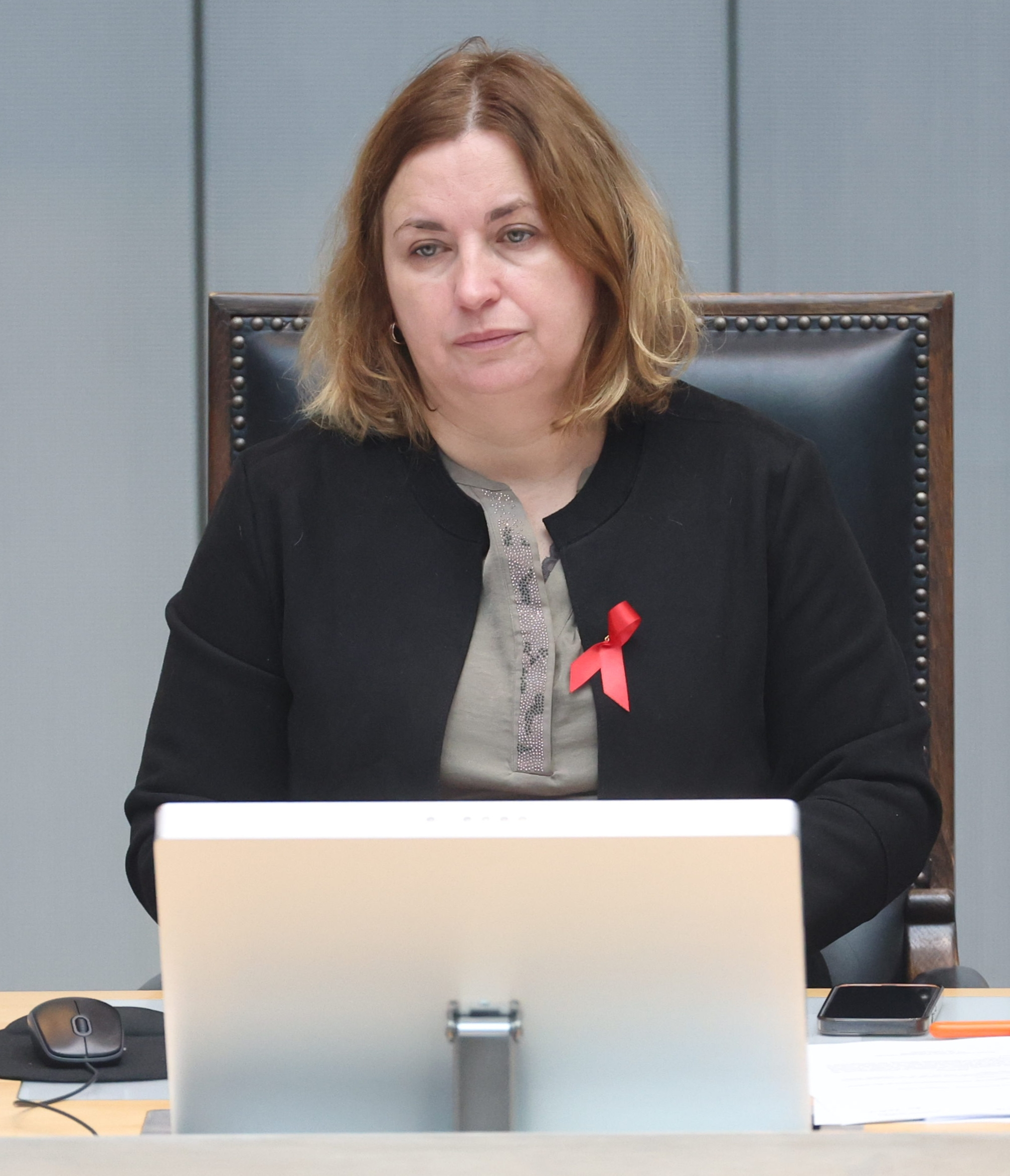
- Tonka Wojahn in 2024

Member of the Berlin House of Representatives
- Incumbent
- Assumed office 2023

Personal details
- Born: 1975 (age 50–51) Haskovo, Bulgaria
- Party: Alliance 90/The Greens
- Website: tonkawojahn.de

Tonka Wojahn (born 1975) is a German politician from the Alliance 90/The Greens. She has been a member of the Berlin House of Representatives since 2023 and a member of its Presidium since June 2024.

== Biography ==
Wojahn grew up in Bulgaria and came to Berlin in 1997 to study. She completed her studies in philology and political science in 2005. From 2000 to 2018, she worked as a translator and consultant in science management. From 2019 to 2021, she was a research assistant to Sabine Bangert, a member of the Berlin House of Representatives.

== Political career ==
Wojahn has been a member of Alliance 90/The Greens since 2009. From 2011 to 2021, she was a member of the Steglitz-Zehlendorf district assembly, serving as chair of the Green Party parliamentary group from 2017. From 2014 to 2017, she chaired the Steglitz-Zehlendorf Green Party district association.

Wojahn ran in the 2016 Berlin state elections in the Steglitz-Zehlendorf 3 constituency and in the 2021 and 2023 elections in the Steglitz-Zehlendorf 2 constituency. After failing to win a seat in the Berlin state parliament in the 2016 and 2021 elections, she entered the House of Representatives in 2023 via the state list. In 2024, she was appointed a member of its presidium. She is a supporter of the implementation of the European minimum wage directive.
