= Marianne Burkert-Eulitz =

German politician & lawyer (born 1972)

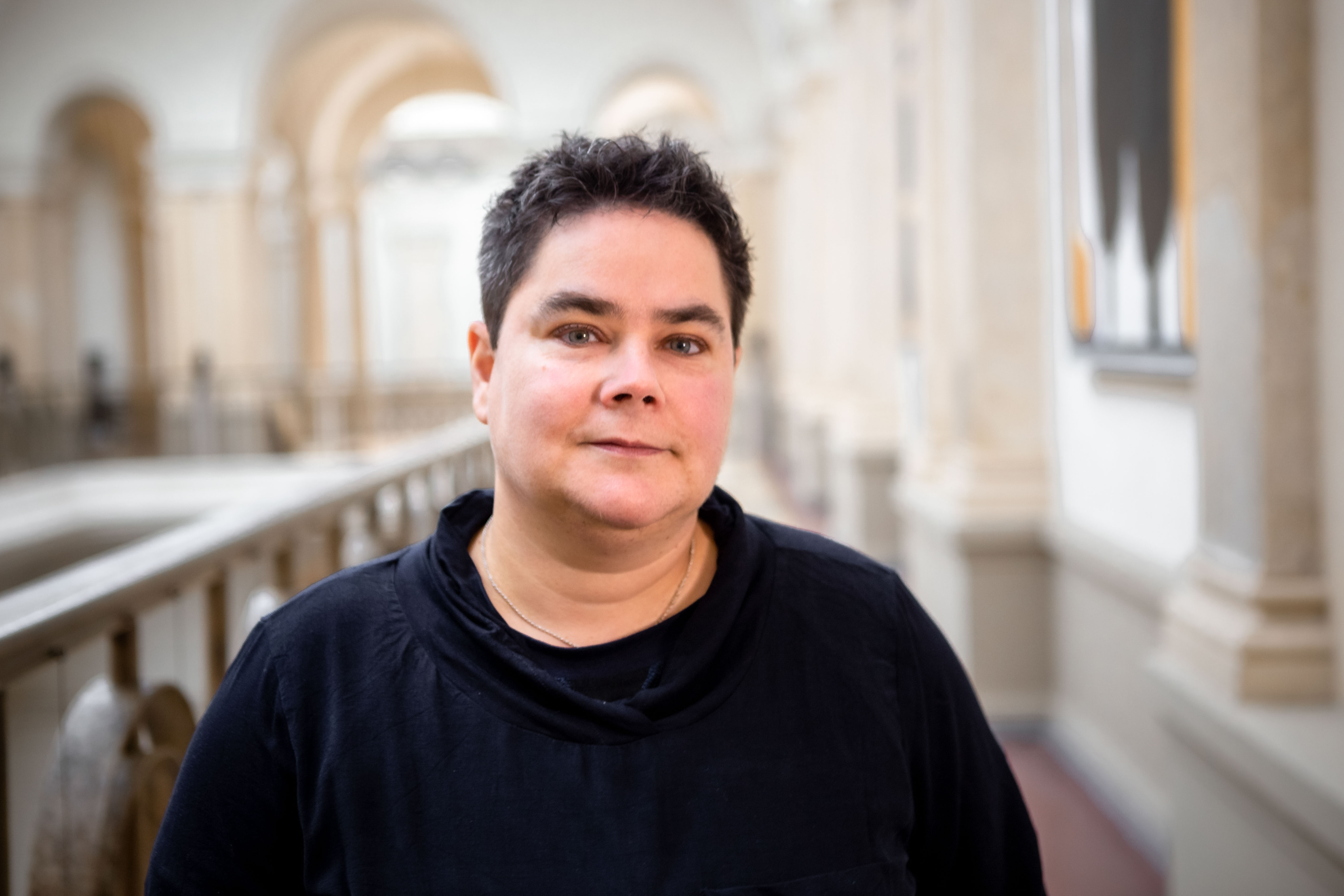
- Marianne Burkert-Eulitz in 2021

Member of the Berlin House of Representatives
- Incumbent
- Assumed office September 2011

Personal details
- Born: 11 June 1972 (age 54) Berlin-Lichtenberg, Germany
- Party: Alliance 90/The Greens
- Education: Humboldt University of Berlin

Marianne Burkert-Eulitz (born 11 June 1972) is a German politician from the Alliance 90/The Greens and lawyer. Since September 2011, she has been a member of the Berlin House of Representatives for the Friedrichshain-Kreuzberg 2 constituency.

== Education and career ==
Burkert-Eulitz graduated from Andreas-Gymnasium in Berlin-Friedrichshain in 1991. She then studied law, education, history, and political science at Humboldt University of Berlin. Since 2006, Burkert-Eulitz has been a lawyer specializing in child, youth, and family law, as well as acting as a legal representative for children in court. Burkert-Eulitz is a member of the Berlin Legal Aid Fund for Youth Welfare.

== Political career ==
Burkert-Eulitz was a member of the district assembly of Friedrichshain-Kreuzberg from 2001 to 2011 and represented Alliance 90/The Greens on the Youth Welfare Committee and the Committee for Social Affairs and Health. From 2006 to 2011, she was chair of the district assembly.

In September 2011, Burkert-Eulitz was elected to the Berlin House of Representatives for the first time in the 2011 election. She won the direct mandate in the Friedrichshain-Kreuzberg 6 constituency with 28.8% of the first vote. In the 2016 Berlin state election election, she retained her direct mandate in the newly redrawn Friedrichshain-Kreuzberg 2 constituency with 33.4% of the vote. She was re-elected to parliament in the 2021 election. She also retained her seat in the 2023 Berlin state election. She is the spokesperson for family and education for the Alliance 90/The Greens parliamentary group. Burkert-Eulitz is also a member of the Presidium of the House of Representatives.

== Personal life ==
Burkert-Eulitz is married and has two children.
