= Jens Hoffmann (politician) =

German politician (born 1981)

Member of the Berlin House of Representatives
- Incumbent
- Assumed office 29 October 2026
- Preceded by: Christian Goiny
- Constituency: Steglitz-Zehlendorf 3

Personal details
- Born: 1981 (age 44–45)
- Party: Christian Democratic Union (since 1999)

Jens Hoffmann (born 1981) is a German politician serving as a member of the Berlin House of Representatives since 2026. He has served as chairman of the Christian Democratic Union in Lichterfelde since 2025.
