= Tom Cywinski =

German politician (born 1987)

Member of the Berlin House of Representatives
- Incumbent
- Assumed office 16 March 2023
- Preceded by: Matthias Kollatz-Ahnen
- Constituency: Steglitz-Zehlendorf 2

Personal details
- Born: 1987 (age 38–39)
- Party: Christian Democratic Union (since 2004)

Tom Jan Filip Cywinski (born 1987) is a German politician serving as a member of the Berlin House of Representatives since 2023. From 2014 to 2023, he was a borough councillor of Steglitz-Zehlendorf.
