= Maria Bigos =

German politician (born 1985)

Member of the Berlin House of Representatives
- Incumbent
- Assumed office 29 October 2026
- Preceded by: Andreas Otto
- Constituency: Pankow 6

Personal details
- Born: 1985 (age 40–41)
- Party: Die Linke

Maria Bigos (born 1985) is a Polish-born German politician serving as a member of the Berlin House of Representatives since 2026. From 2021 to 2026, she was a borough councillor of Pankow.
