= Olaf Schenk =

German computer scientist

- Education: ETH Zurich; Karlsruhe Institute of Technology
- Scientific career
- Fields: High Performance Computing; Applied mathematics Numerical analysis
- Workplaces: Università della Svizzera italiana ETH Zurich
- Thesis: Scalable Parallel LU Factorization Methods on Shared Memory Multiprocessors (2000)
- Doctoral advisor: Wolfgang Fichtner; Martin Hermann Gutknecht

Olaf Schenk is a German mathematician and computer scientist. He is full professor of the faculty of Informatics at the Università della Svizzera italiana (USI) in Lugano, and external lecturer of the Department of Mathematics at ETH Zurich. Schenk is a Fellow of the SIAM, and a senior member of IEEE, and ACM. His research interests are inherent to the field of High-performance computing, in particular to the development and optimization of algorithms and software tools to perform large-scale simulations. One of his main contribution is the PARDISO project, a software tool for solving large-scale sparse matrices. He is the co-director of the Institute of Computing and of the Master of Science in Computational Science at USI.

== Recognition ==
A 2020 paper on recursive algebraic graph coloring technique for hardware-efficient symmetric sparse matrix-vector multiplication by Schenk with Christie Louis Alappat, Georg Hager, Gerhard Wellein, Achim Basermann, Alan R. Bishop, Holger Fehske and Jonas Thies won the 2020 Society for Industrial and Applied Mathematics (SIAM) Activity Group on Supercomputing Best Paper Prize for the best paper on parallel scientific and engineering computing from the previous four years.

In 2020 Schenk was named a SIAM Fellow "for advances in the development of robust parallel sparse matrix algorithms and their effective use in large-scale science and engineering applications".
