= Vanessa Emde =

German politician (born 1976)

- Emde in 2026

Member of the Abgeordnetenhaus of Berlin
- Incumbent
- Assumed office 27 October 2026

Personal details
- Born: 14 January 1981 (age 45) Düsseldorf
- Party: Die Linke (since 2022)

Vanessa Emde (born 14 January 1981) is a German theater director and politician (The Left Party). She was elected to the state parliament in the 2026 election to the Berlin House of Representatives.

== Live ==
Vanessa Emde was born in 1981 in Düsseldorf. Vanessa Emde grew up with a single mother. After completing her secondary school education (Realschulabschluss), she graduated with Abitur through an alternative educational pathway. From 2003 to 2009, she studied Comparative Literature and Gender Studies at Humboldt University of Berlin and the Peter Szondi Institute at the Free University of Berlin. During her studies, she created several performances for theaters in Berlin.

Subsequently, Emde studied theater directing at the Academy of Performing Arts in Ludwigsburg until 2012. From 2013 onwards, Emde worked as a freelance director and playwright.

Emde is not married and has no children.

== Politics ==
In 2022, she joined the party Die Linke and has since been active in its Neukölln district branch. In November 2024, Emde was elected to the board of the district branch. For a period of time, she was employed by the party in a paid position.

The Neukölln district branch nominated Emde for the 2026 House of Representatives elections in the Neukölln 1 constituency, as well as for the second spot on the district party list. Emde won her constituency with 46.2 percent of the vote and secured a direct seat in the parliament.

Emde is active in the Trotskyist theoretical group “Socialism from Below.” Within her party, Emde advocates a strict opposition stance. There is no record of her statements on applied politics issues such as climate change, social policy, infrastructure etc. that concern her city.

== Emde and the Middle East Conflict ==
Emde has been active as she states in internationalist circles for “many years” and in solidarity groups for the liberation of Palestine.

It is not known whether she has ever visited Israel or Palestine. From Berlin, she advocates within her party an explicit position in favor of Palestinian independence. In 2022, she co-founded the "Palestine Solidarity" working group within the Neukölln district branch of the party. She is also active in the state-level "Palestine Solidarity" working group.

== Relation to the party and parliamentary group ==
During the exploratory and coalition talks between The Left (Die Linke), the SPD, and the A90/The Greens, the SPD and the Greens demanded that Emde not be admitted to The Left's parliamentary group. On October 13, 2026, Emde like all other newly elected members of The Left signed a declaration opposing antisemitism and affirming Israel's right to exist. During a meeting of the Left Party parliamentary group, Emde herself signed the document stating, in point 1: “We uphold Israel’s right to exist and support equal rights for all people in Israel.” Following this, she was admitted to her party's parliamentary group.

Shortly thereafter, in an Instagram video, Emde distanced herself from the very declaration she had just signed. The declaration, she argued, serves as a “coalition gift” to the “election losers,” by forcing them to commit to a two-state solution. She reiterated her position that states, as such, do not have a right to exist. She described her admission into the parliamentary group as a tactical "gain of ground against the Staatsräson" (the principle of state interest/reason of state).

At the state party conference on October 31, 2026, party members, including elected representatives engaged in a general debate on whether and how to initiate formal negotiations for the formation of a red-green-red senate, led by top candidate Elif Eralp. Emde did not participate; instead, she joined a group of Palestinian activists and Trotskyists to demonstrate against such a coalition outside the venue.

Consequently, the party leadership and the parliamentary group executive concluded that there was no longer a "common basis for working together" with Emde. On November 6, 2026, the Berlin state executive of The Left called on her to resign her mandate, stating that they no longer had any trust in her. Emde refused.

At public events, she has since been criticizing the party leadership for failing to take an unequivocal stance in support of the Palestina movement.

The leadership of her party's parliamentary group subsequently moved for her expulsion. The reasoning provided was that Emde had shown no willingness whatsoever to return to the jointly agreed-upon basis for working together. Given Emde's refusal, the loss of trust, and the damage caused to the parliamentary group, this step was deemed the only remaining option.
