= 1999 Berlin state election =

Berlin Mayoral election of 1999

- 10 October 1999

All 169 seats of the Abgeordnetenhaus of Berlin 85 seats needed for a majority
- Turnout: 1,563,576 (65.5%) ▼3.1%
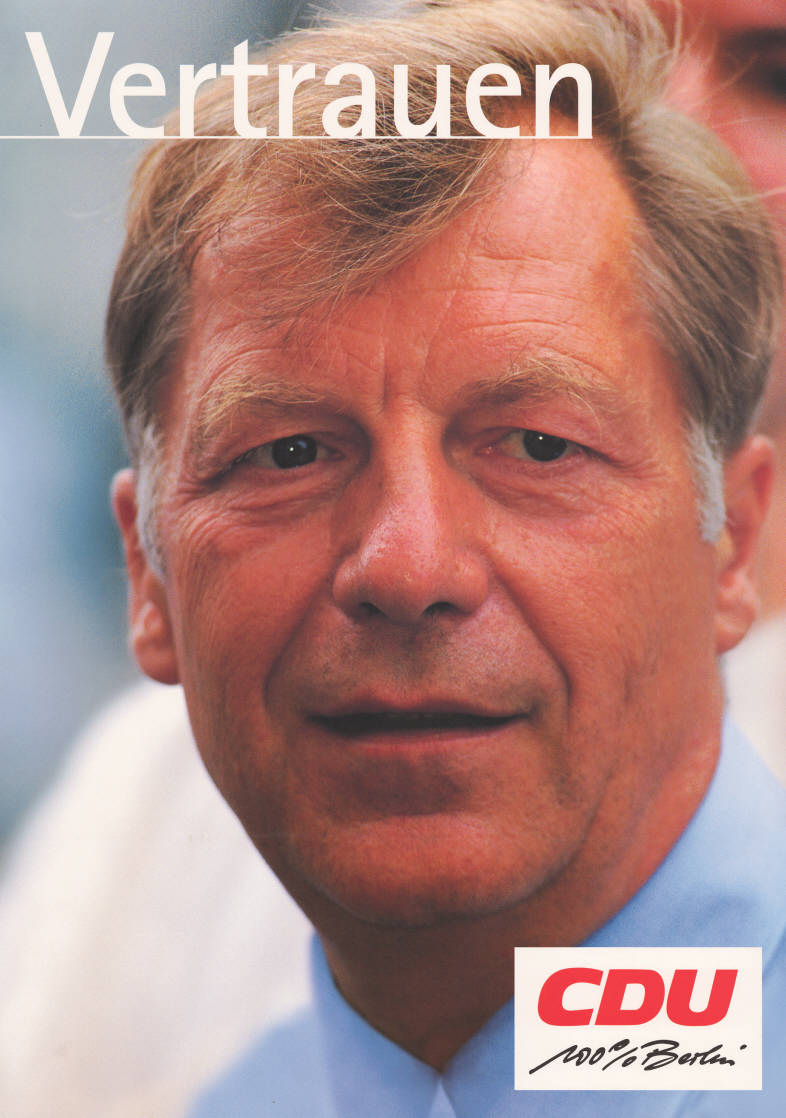

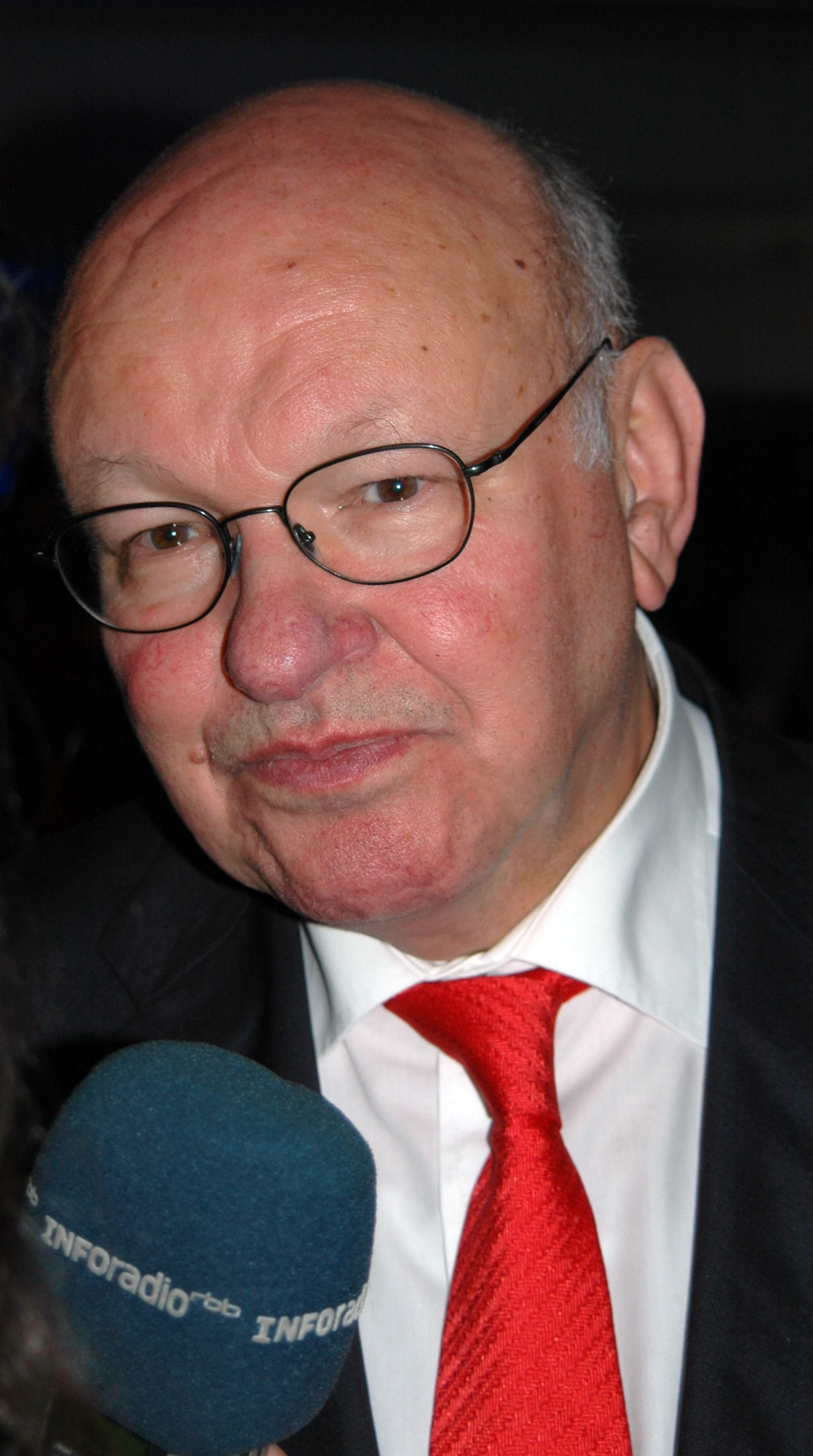

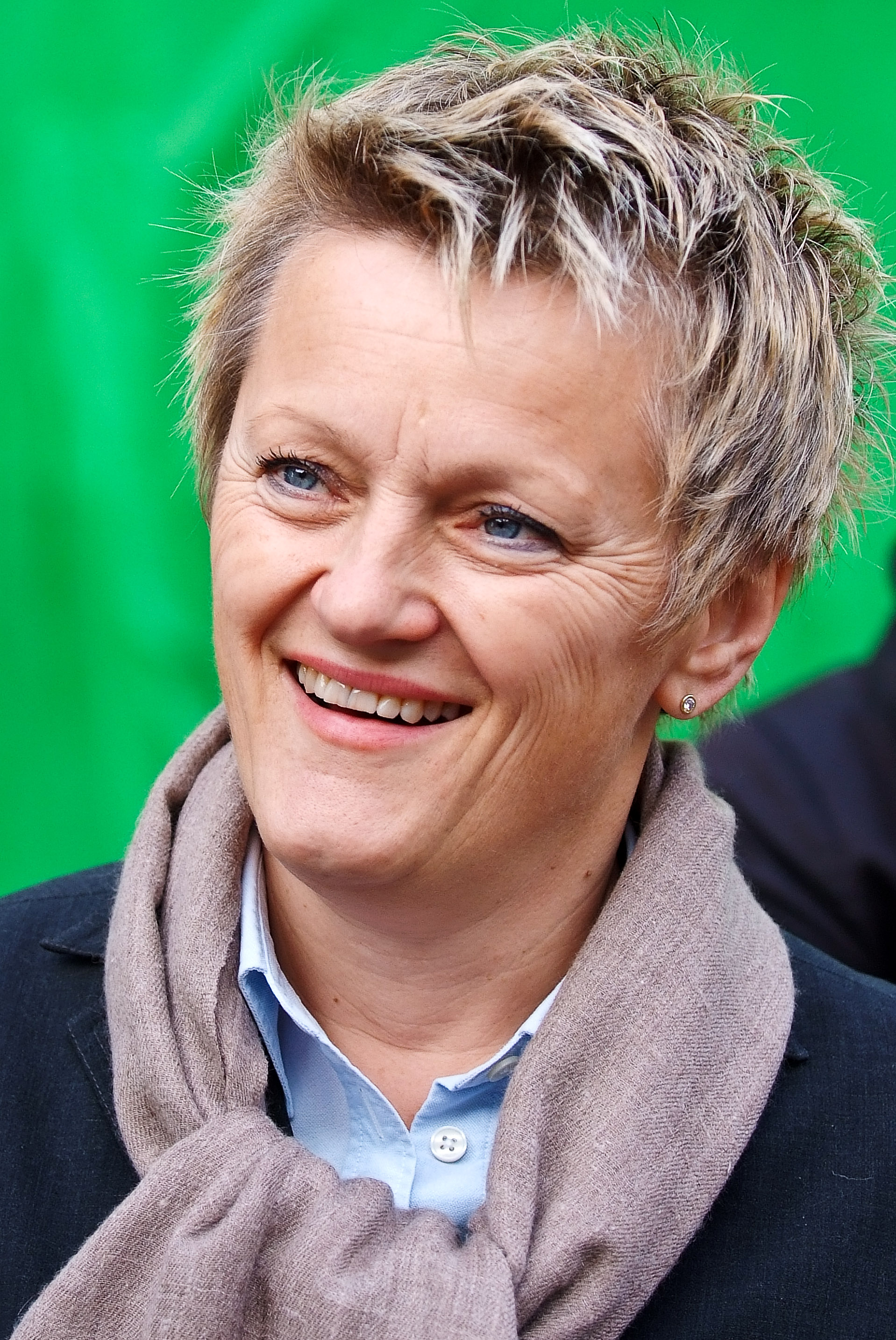
	First party	Second party
Leader	Eberhard Diepgen	Walter Momper
Party	CDU	SPD
Last election	87 seats, 37.4%	55 seats, 23.6%
Seats won	76	42
Seat change	▼11	▼13
Popular vote	637,311	349,731
Percentage	40.8%	22.4%
Swing	▲3.4%	▼1.2%
	Third party	Fourth party
Leader		Renate Künast
Party	PDS	Greens
Last election	34 seats, 13.6%	30 seats, 13.2%
Seats won	33	18
Seat change	▼1	▼12
Popular vote	276,869	155,322
Percentage	17.7%	9.9%
Swing	▲3.1%	▼3.3%
- Results for single-member constituencies.
Mayor before election
Eberhard Diepgen
CDU
Elected Mayor
Eberhard Diepgen
CDU

The 1999 Berlin state election was held on 10 October 1999 to elect the members of the 14th Abgeordnetenhaus of Berlin. The incumbent grand coalition between the Christian Democratic Union (CDU) and Social Democratic Party (SPD) retained government. CDU leader Eberhard Diepgen was re-elected as Mayor.

== Parties ==
The table below lists parties represented in the 13th Abgeordnetenhaus of Berlin.

Name		Ideology	Leader(s)	1995 result	
Name		Ideology	Leader(s)	Votes (%)	Seats
CDU	Christian Democratic Union of Germany; Christlich Demokratische Union Deutschlands	Christian democracy	Eberhard Diepgen	37.4%	87 / 206
SPD	Social Democratic Party of Germany; Sozialdemokratische Partei Deutschlands	Social democracy	Klaus Wowereit	23.6%	55 / 206
PDS	Party of Democratic Socialism; Partei des Demokratischen Sozialismus	Democratic socialism		13.6%	34 / 206
Grüne	Alliance 90/The Greens; Bündnis 90/Die Grünen	Green politics	Renate Künast	13.2%	30 / 206

== Opinion polling ==
Polling firm	Fieldwork date	Sample size	CDU	SPD	PDS	Grüne	FDP	Others	Lead
1999 state election	10 Oct 1999	–	40.8	22.4	17.7	9.9	2.2	7.0	18.4
INFO GmbH	Sep 1999	1,201	42.2	17.3	16.6	12.1	–	–	24.9
Infratest dimap	23–28 Sep 1999	1,000	45	21	16	10	3	5	24
Forsa	26 Sep 1999	?	42	20	17	11	–	–	22
INFO GmbH	August–July 1999	1,215	38	21	17	13	–	–	17
Infratest dimap	3 Jul 1999	?	44	23	15	11	2	5	21
Forsa	27 Jun 1999	?	38	22	16	13	–	–	16
Infratest dimap	15–20 Mar 1999	1,000	35	29	14	12	4	6	6
Forsa	26 Jan 1999	1,070	31	32	–	–	–	–	1
INFO GmbH	22 Jan 1999	?	32	44	9	12	–	–	12
Infratest dimap	5–11 Mar 1998	1,000	25	36	16	16	3	4	11
1995 state election	22 Oct 1995	–	37.4	23.6	14.6	13.2	2.5	8.7	13.8

== Election result ==
Party	Votes	%	+/–	Seats	+/–
Christian Democratic Union (CDU)	637,311	40.76	+3.4	76	-11
Social Democratic Party (SPD)	349,731	22.37	-1.2	42	-13
Party of Democratic Socialism (PDS)	276,869	17.71	+3.1	33	-1
Alliance 90/The Greens (Grüne)	155,322	9.93	-3.3	18	-12
The Republicans (REP)	41,814	2.67	±0.0	0	±0
Free Democratic Party (FDP)	34,280	2.19	-0.3	0	±0
The Grays – Gray Panthers (Graue)	17,559	1.12	-0.6	0	±0
Human Environment Animal Protection Party	16,732	1.07	New	0	New
Others	33,958	2.17		0	±0
Total	1,563,576	100.00	–	169	–

Popular Vote
CDU	40.76%
SPD	22.37%
PDS	17.71%
B'90/GRÜNE	9.93%
FDP	2.19%
Other	7.04%

Abgeordnetenhaus seats
CDU	44.97%
SPD	24.85%
PDS	19.53%
B'90/GRÜNE	10.65%

	SPD	CDU/CSU	PDS	Grüne	FDP	REP	NPD	Others
West Berlin	25,2	49,3	4,2	12,1	2,8	2,6		3.8
East Berlin	17,8	26,9	39,5	6,4	1,1	2,8	1,6	3.8
