= 2006 Berlin state election =

State election in Berlin, Germany

- 17 September 2006

All 149 seats of the Abgeordnetenhaus of Berlin 75 seats needed for a majority
- Turnout: 1,377,355 (58.0%) ▼10.1%
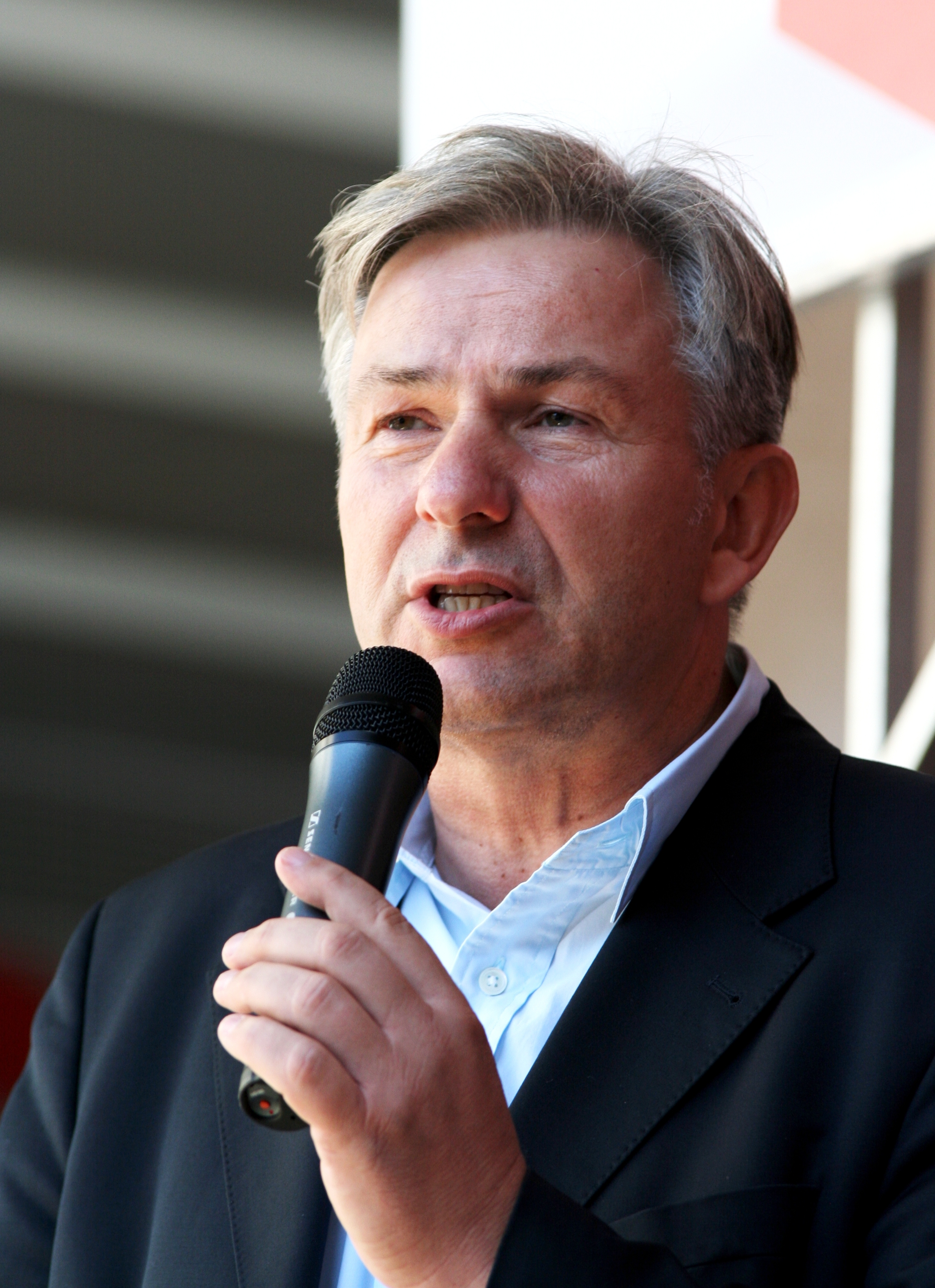

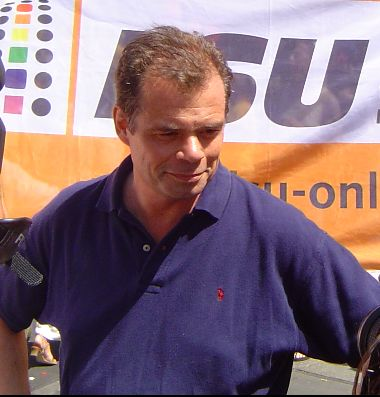

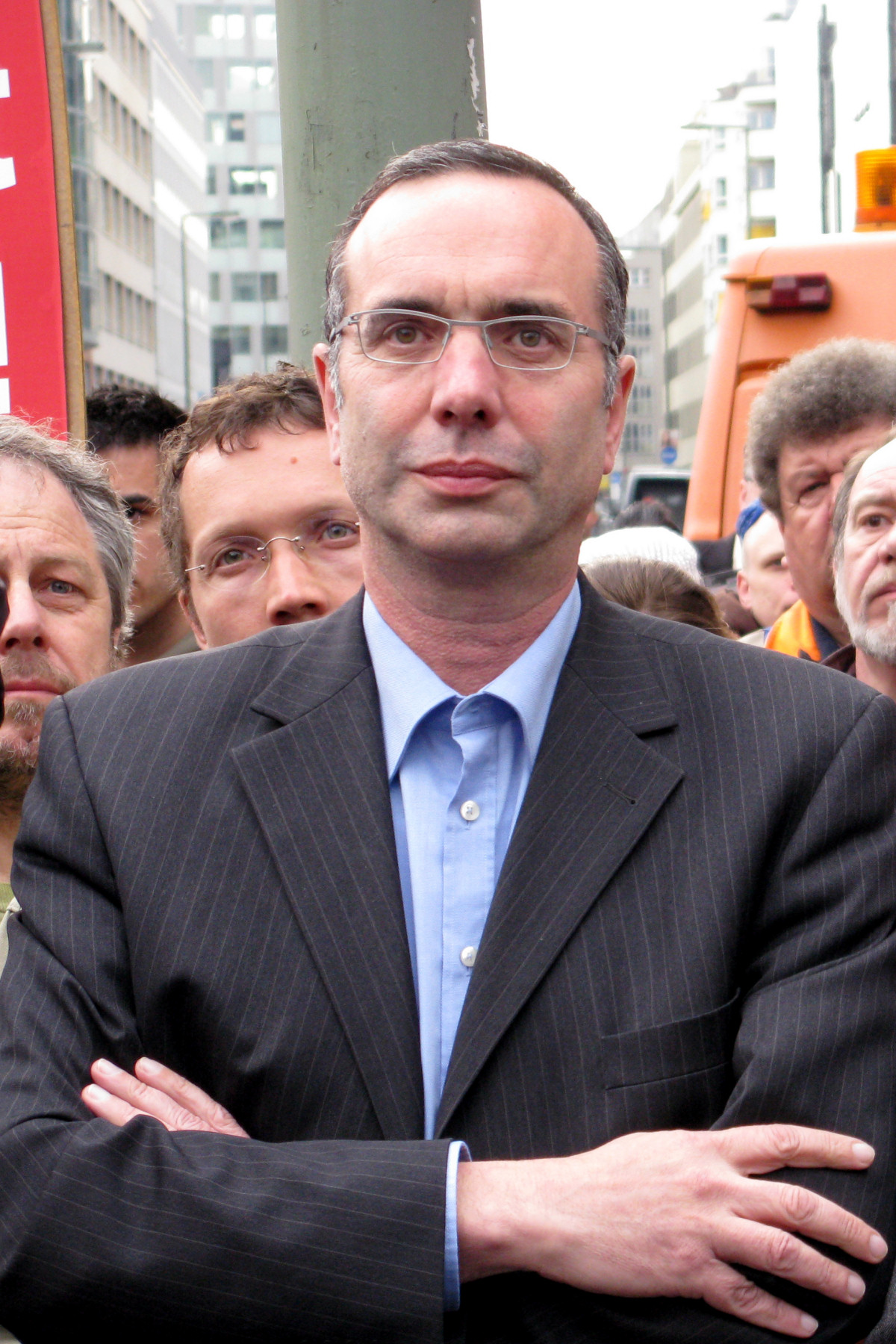

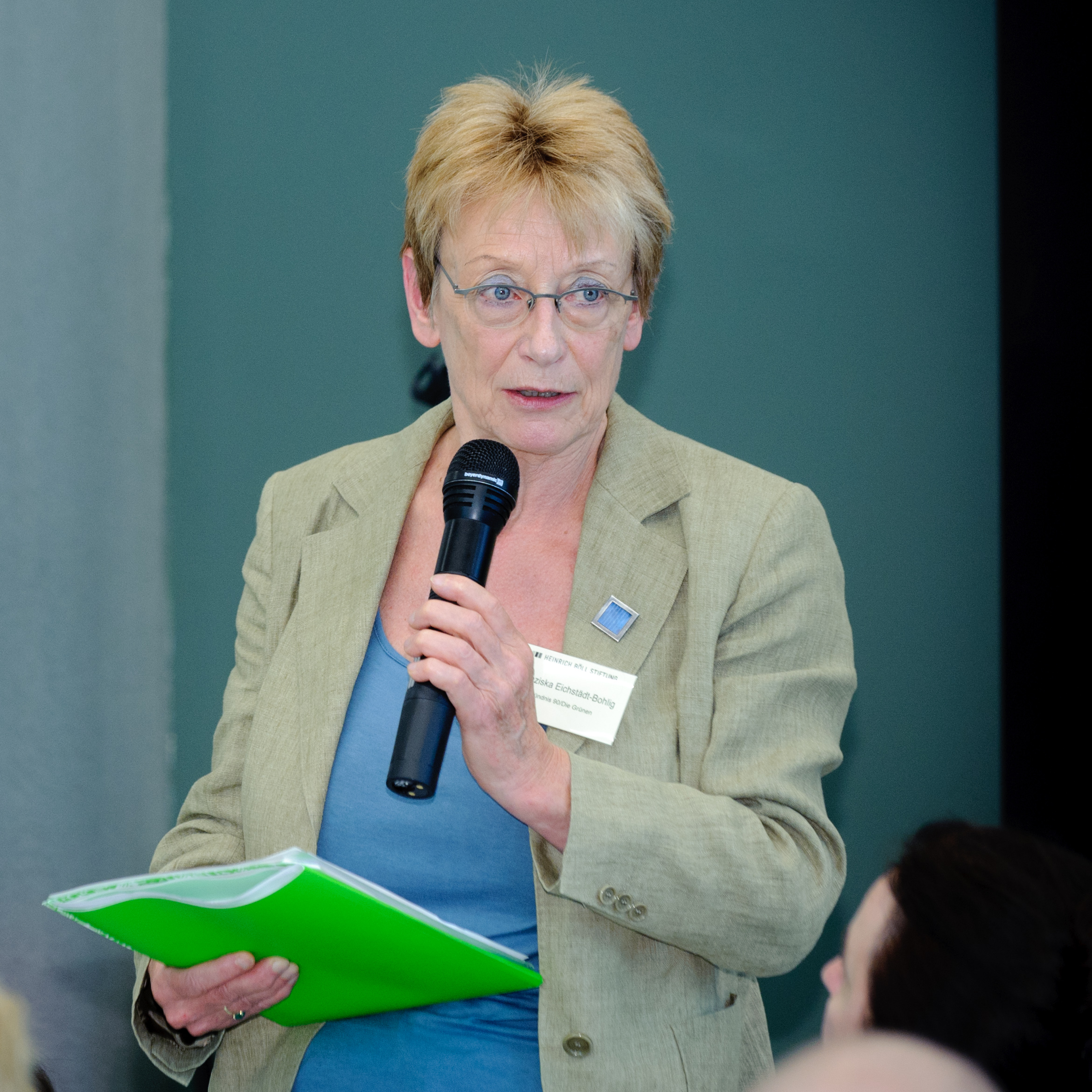
	First party	Second party	Third party
Leader	Klaus Wowereit	Friedbert Pflüger	Harald Wolf
Party	SPD	CDU	PDS
Last election	44 seats, 29.7%	35 seats, 23.8%	33 seats, 22.6%
Seats won	53	37	23
Seat change	▲9	▲2	▼10
Popular vote	424,054	294,026	185,185
Percentage	30.8%	21.3%	13.4%
Swing	▲1.1%	▼2.5%	▼9.2%
	Fourth party	Fifth party
Leader	Franziska Eichstädt-Bohlig	Martin Lindner
Party	Greens	FDP
Last election	14 seats, 9.1%	15 seats, 9.9%
Seats won	23	13
Seat change	▲9	▼2
Popular vote	180,865	104,584
Percentage	13.1%	7.6%
Swing	▲4.0%	▼2.3%
- Results for single-member constituencies.
Mayor before election
Klaus Wowereit
SPD
Elected Mayor
Klaus Wowereit
SPD

The 2006 Berlin state election was held on 17 September 2006 to elect the members of the 16th Abgeordnetenhaus of Berlin. The incumbent government of the Social Democratic Party (SPD) and Party of Democratic Socialism (PDS) narrowly retained a majority, though PDS suffered major losses. Mayor Klaus Wowereit continued in office.

== Parties ==
The table below lists parties represented in the previous, 15th Abgeordnetenhaus of Berlin.

Name		Ideology	Leader(s)	2001 result	
Name		Ideology	Leader(s)	Votes (%)	Seats
SPD	Social Democratic Party of Germany; Sozialdemokratische Partei Deutschlands	Social democracy	Klaus Wowereit	29.7%	44 / 141
CDU	Christian Democratic Union of Germany; Christlich Demokratische Union Deutschlands	Christian democracy	Friedbert Pflüger	23.8%	35 / 141
PDS	Party of Democratic Socialism; Partei des Demokratischen Sozialismus	Democratic socialism	Harald Wolf	22.6%	33 / 141
FDP	Free Democratic Party; Freie Demokratische Partei	Classical liberalism	Martin Lindner	9.9%	15 / 141
Grüne	Alliance 90/The Greens; Bündnis 90/Die Grünen	Green politics	Franziska Eichstädt-Bohlig	9.1%	14 / 141

== Opinion polling ==
Polling firm	Fieldwork date	Sample size	SPD	CDU	PDS	FDP	Grüne	WASG	Others	Lead
2006 state election	17 Sep 2006	–	30.8	21.3	13.4	7.6	13.1	2.9	10.8	9.5
Emnid	4–7 Sep 2006	1,001	33	22	15	9	14	3	4	11
Forsa	4–7 Sep 2006	1,001	31	20	17	8	14	2	8	11
Forschungsgruppe Wahlen	4–7 Sep 2006	1,027	32	22	17	8	13	–	8	10
Infratest dimap	4–6 Sep 2006	1,000	33	21	15	7	14	3	7	12
Emnid	21–24 Aug 2006	1,000	33	21	16	9	14	3	4	12
Infratest dimap	18–22 Aug 2006	1,000	32	21	16	8	16	2	5	11
Forsa	7–17 Aug 2006	1,001	32	21	16	10	14	1	6	11
Emnid	31 Jul–3 Aug 2006	1,000	32	22	15	9	14	5	3	10
Infratest dimap	31 Jul–2 Aug 2006	1,000	35	23	15	8	13	–	6	12
Forsa	10–20 Jul 2006	1,002	30	21	17	10	16	–	6	9
Emnid	26–29 Jun 2006	1,005	34	23	14	8	13	4	4	11
Forsa	12–22 Jun 2006	1,002	33	24	15	8	14	–	6	9
Emnid	29 May–1 Jun 2006	1,006	36	21	15	7	12	5	4	15
Forsa	2–11 May 2006	1,001	32	26	15	6	14	–	7	6
Emnid	2–4 May 2006	1,008	36	23	13	5	14	3	6	13
Forsa	3–12 Apr 2006	1,001	32	24	15	6	16	–	8	8
Emnid	27–29 Mar 2006	750	34	26	15	7	12	–	6	8
Forsa	6–16 Mar 2006	1,001	33	24	14	7	14	2	6	9
Emnid	27 Feb–1 Mar 2006	1,000	37	25	13	7	12	3	3	12
Forsa	13–16 Feb 2006	1,003	36	25	13	6	14	–	6	11
Emnid	6–8 Feb 2006	1,000	35	24	13	6	13	4	5	11
Forsa	16–19 Jan 2006	1,000	34	23	16	7	15	–	5	11
Forsa	12–15 Dec 2005	1,001	35	21	16	8	14	–	6	14
Forsa	7–10 Nov 2005	1,002	39	19	16	8	13	–	5	20
Forsa	10–13 Oct 2005	1,002	34	20	17	5	15	–	6	14
Forsa	5–8 Sep 2005	~1,000	31	28	16	6	13	–	6	3
Emnid	4 Sep 2005	?	32	25	18	6	15	–	4	7
Infratest dimap	11–15 Aug 2005	1,000	29	27	18	7	15	–	4	2
Forsa	8–11 Aug 2005	1,000	29	26	20	6	20	–	7	3
Emnid	31 Jul 2005	?	26	29	14	6	14	6	5	3
Forsa	16 Jul 2005	?	28	28	13	5	14	6	6	Tie
Emnid	2 Jul 2005	?	27	31	16	6	15	2	3	4
Forsa	6–9 Jun 2005	1,001	30	25	16	5	16	–	8	5
Infratest dimap	6–7 Jun 2005	1,000	26	30	17	9	13	–	5	4
Emnid	4 Jun 2005	?	31	32	12	5	15	–	5	1
Forsa	9–12 May 2005	1,005	32	27	12	6	16	–	7	5
Emnid	30 Apr 2005	?	28	29	14	6	18	–	5	1
Forsa	11–14 Apr 2005	1,000	29	29	12	7	15	–	8	Tie
Emnid	4 Apr 2005	754	29	29	13	8	16	–	5	Tie
Forsa	7–10 Mar 2005	1,003	29	28	13	7	15	–	8	1
Emnid	6 Mar 2005	?	29	26	14	8	18	–	5	3
Forsa	7–10 Feb 2005	1,004	29	27	14	7	15	–	8	2
Emnid	30 Jan 2005	?	31	27	13	7	17	–	5	4
Forsa	18 Jan 2005	?	29	26	15	7	16	–	7	3
Emnid	9 Jan 2005	750	30	27	13	8	17	–	5	3
Forsa	13–16 Dec 2004	1,003	28	28	15	7	15	–	7	Tie
Emnid	5 Dec 2004	?	27	29	13	7	18	–	6	2
Forsa	20 Nov 2004	?	28	26	15	7	17	–	7	2
Emnid	31 Oct 2004	?	27	28	13	7	19	–	6	1
Forsa	11–14 Oct 2004	1,000	26	27	14	8	17	–	8	1
Emnid	2 Oct 2004	?	24	27	15	7	21	–	6	3
Forsa	6–9 Sep 2004	1,004	22	28	16	7	18	–	9	6
Forsa	9–12 Aug 2004	1,004	17	30	17	8	18	–	10	12
Emnid	July 2004	750	22	31	14	6	21	–	6	9
Forsa	12–15 Jul 2004	1,003	18	29	15	8	21	–	9	8
Emnid	4 Jul 2004	?	22	32	15	6	18	–	7	10
Forsa	14–17 Jun 2004	1,000	20	30	16	5	19	–	10	10
Emnid	30 May 2004	750	24	36	13	6	15	–	6	12
Forsa	7–13 May 2004	1,005	24	33	14	5	16	–	8	9
Emnid	2 May 2004	?	22	36	12	6	17	–	7	14
Forsa	13 Apr 2004	?	21	35	14	5	16	–	9	14
Emnid	4 Apr 2004	757	21	34	13	6	19	–	7	13
Forsa	8–11 Mar 2004	1,007	20	34	14	5	18	–	9	14
Emnid	23–25 Feb 2004	750	22	35	11	7	19	–	6	13
Forsa	9–12 Feb 2004	1,005	21	33	14	9	16	–	7	12
Forsa	31 Jan 2004	?	23	34	13	7	18	–	5	11
Forsa	12–15 Dec 2003	1,000	20	34	15	7	17	–	7	14
Emnid	28 Dec 2003	759	24	34	13	7	17	–	5	12
Forsa	5–11 Dec 2003	1,008	21	33	15	7	17	–	7	12
Infratest dimap	1–3 Dec 2003	1,000	25	33	15	7	16	–	4	8
Emnid	30 Nov 2003	?	25	32	13	7	17	–	6	7
Forsa	7–13 Nov 2003	1,007	25	33	14	7	15	–	6	8
Emnid	2 Nov 2003	752	24	33	11	7	18	–	7	9
Forsa	20 Oct 2003	?	28	31	12	6	16	–	7	3
Emnid	28 Sep 2003	?	26	33	11	6	18	–	6	7
Forsa	2–10 Sep 2003	1,001	31	33	10	6	15	–	5	2
Emnid	31 Aug 2003	?	29	30	10	7	18	–	6	1
Infratest dimap	22–26 Aug 2003	1,000	29	30	15	8	13	–	5	1
Forsa	7–13 Aug 2003	1,004	31	29	11	7	16	–	6	2
Emnid	3 Aug 2003	?	28	31	11	7	18	–	5	3
Forsa	19 Jul 2003	?	30	30	12	8	16	–	4	Tie
Emnid	29 Jun 2003	?	28	31	11	7	19	–	4	3
Forsa	3–11 Jun 2003	1,031	30	28	13	8	17	–	4	2
Emnid	1 Jun 2003	?	31	29	10	7	18	–	5	2
Forsa	8–15 May 2003	1,002	31	27	12	8	17	–	5	4
Emnid	27 Apr 2003	?	32	28	9	8	19	–	4	4
Forsa	4–10 Apr 2003	1,001	28	32	9	8	19	–	4	4
Emnid	30 Mar 2003	?	32	29	10	7	19	–	3	3
Forsa	15 Feb 2003	?	25	32	13	7	17	–	6	7
Emnid	2 Feb 2003	751	28	33	10	6	19	–	5	5
Emnid	29 Dec 2002	750	29	32	10	8	18	–	4	3
Emnid	1 Dec 2002	750	26	35	10	6	18	–	5	9
Forsa	18–21 Nov 2002	1,001	31	28	13	7	16	–	5	3
Emnid	7–10 Oct 2002	753	39	27	10	6	14	–	4	12
Emnid	September 2002	753	38	26	12	7	12	–	3	12
Forsa	5–8 Aug 2002	1,007	36	25	13	10	11	–	5	11
Emnid	8–10 Jul 2002	750	31	27	16	9	13	–	4	4
Forsa	13 Jul 2002	?	34	24	18	9	10	–	5	10
Emnid	12–18 Jun 2002	750	32	26	17	9	12	–	4	4
Forsa	16 May 2002	?	30	26	19	9	11	–	5	4
Forsa	28 Apr 2002	?	32	26	18	10	10	–	4	6
Infratest dimap	15–18 Apr 2002	1,000	30	27	20	9	10	–	4	3
Forsa	31 Mar 2002	?	32	24	20	8	10	–	6	8
Forsa	3 Mar 2002	?	30	23	22	9	10	–	6	7
Forsa	27 Jan 2002	?	29	26	23	6	11	–	5	3
Forsa	9 Dec 2001	?	31	25	23	7	9	–	5	6
2001 state election	21 Oct 2001	–	29.7	23.8	22.6	9.9	9.1	–	4.9	5.9

== Election result ==
Summary of the 17 September 2006 election results for the Abgeordnetenhaus of Berlin
Party	Votes	%	+/–	Seats	+/–
Social Democratic Party (SPD)	424,054	30.79	+1.1	53	+9
Christian Democratic Union (CDU)	294,026	21.35	-2.5	37	+2
Party of Democratic Socialism (PDS)	185,185	13.44	-9.2	23	-10
Alliance 90/The Greens (Grüne)	180,865	13.13	+4.0	23	+9
Free Democratic Party (FDP)	104,584	7.59	-2.3	13	-2
The Grays – Gray Panthers (Graue)	52,884	3.84	+2.4	0	±0
Labour and Social Justice – The Electoral Alternative (WASG)	40,504	2.94	New	0	New
National Democratic Party (NPD)	35,229	2.56	+1.7	0	±0
Others	60,024	4.36		0	±0
Total	1,377,355	100.00	–	149	–

Popular Vote
SPD	30.79%
CDU	21.35%
PDS	13.44%
B'90/GRÜNE	13.13%
FDP	7.59%
Other	13.70%

Abgeordnetenhaus seats
SPD	35.57%
CDU	24.83%
PDS	15.44%
B'90/GRÜNE	15.44%
FDP	8.72%

	SPD	CDU/CSU	PDS	Grüne	FDP	Others	Grey	WASG	NPD
West Berlin	31.4	27.7	4.2	14.8	9.3	12.6	4.4	2.7	1.7
East Berlin	29.8	11.4	28.1	10.5	4.9	15.4	3.0	3.3	4.0
