= The Grays – Gray Panthers =

The Grays – Gray Panthers Die Grauen – Graue Panther
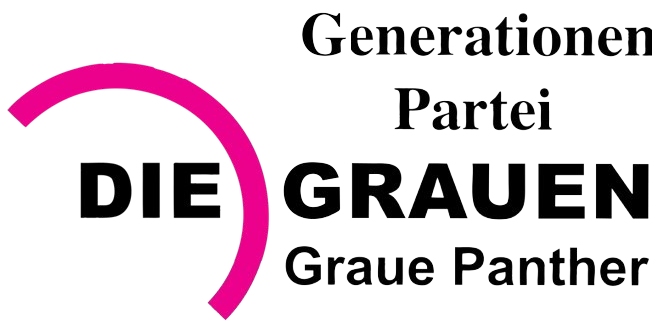
- Party logo
- Founded: 12 July 1989
- Dissolved: 17 March 2008
- Succeeded by: Gray Panthers
- Ideology: Green politics Senior citizens interests

The Grays – Gray Panthers (German: Die Grauen – Graue Panther) was a small German political party and interest group which existed between 1989 and 2008. The party was founded by former Die Grünen MP and activist Trude Unruh, having emerged from the Senior Citizens Protection Association which she had started in 1975. Their main areas of focus were the protection of the interests of seniors and the securing of stable pensions. They were also active on environmental issues.

The Grays participated in the 1990 federal elections for the first time.

In 2006, the Grays won 3.8% of the vote in the federal state elections in Berlin, their best result in a regional election. Unruh served as party president until September 2007, when she was succeeded by Norbert Raeder, who resigned at the end of January 2008, only four months after taking up the position. At a congress on 1 March 2008, it was decided to dissolve the party in the wake of a donation scandal, and subsequent insolvency. The vote on 17 March would confirm this decision definitively, with the party being officially dissolved on 29 March 2008.

The Gray Panthers party, which emerged from various splinter groups, succeeded the Grays. The Grays – Gray Panthers are not to be confused with the small party Die Grauen - For All Generations, founded in 2017.

== See also ==
- Gray Panthers
- Grey Power
- List of pensioners' parties
