= Brigitte Young =

International development specialist

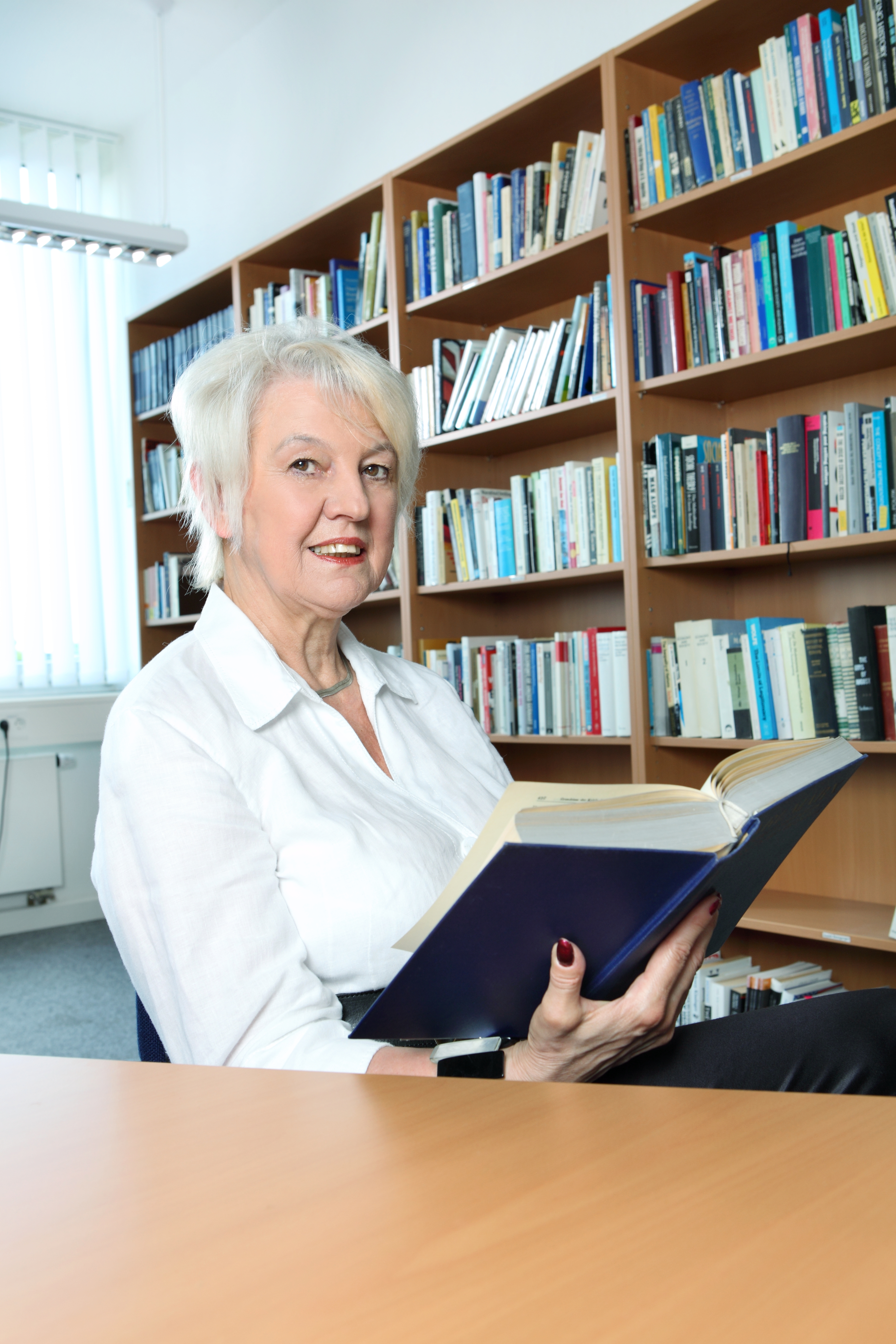
- Brigitte Young in her office
- Born: 26 May 1946 (age 80); Groß Sankt Florian, Austria

Academic background
- Education: University of California, Santa Barbara (B.A. 1978); University of California, Davis (M.A. 1982); University of Wisconsin–Madison (M.A. 1986); University of Wisconsin–Madison (Ph.D. 1990); Free University of Berlin (habil. 1998)

Academic work
- Discipline: Political Science; Feminist economics Development economics
- Institutions: University of Münster

Brigitte Young (born 26 May 1946 in Groß Sankt Florian, Austria), is Professor Emeritus of International political economy at the Institute of Political Science, University of Münster, Germany. Her research areas include economic globalization, global governance, feminist economics, international trade, global financial market governance and monetary policy. She has worked on EU-US financial regulatory frameworks, European economic and monetary integration and heterodox economic theories. She is the author of many journal articles and books in English and German on the 2008 financial crisis, the subprime mortgage crisis, the euro area crisis, including the role of Germany and France.

== Early life and education ==
Brigitte Young studied from 1978 to 1982 at the University of California, Santa Barbara and University of California, Davis, and from 1984 to 1990 at the University of Wisconsin-Madison.

== Career ==
After obtaining a PhD in International political economy she became a professor at Wesleyan University (1991–1997). Between 1994 and 1995, Brigitte Young was also a Research Fellow in "German and European Studies" at the School of Foreign Service at Georgetown University. From 1997 to 1999 she taught at the Otto Suhr Institute of the Free University of Berlin. There she obtained her Habilitation under Elmar Altvater on the topic of "Globalisation and the gender regime." In 1999 she became professor of international political economy at the Institute for Political Science at the University of Münster.

Since 2011 she was Professor Emeritus of International political economy at the Institute of Political Science, University of Münster, Germany.

She has held guest professorships at Science Politique in Paris (2008/2009), Science-Politique in Lille (Fall 2010), Warwick University, UK (2011) and Central European University, Budapest (Spring 2012).

Brigitte was involved in the EU-Horizon 2020 Project, both on the Advisory Board of COFFERS (Combatting Fiscal Fraud and Empowering Regulators) from 2016 to 2019 and ion the Advisory Board of EMU_SCEUS (The Choice for Europe since Maastricht. Member States’ Preferences for Economic and Financial Integration) from 2016 to 2020).

For her work on Economics and Gender Equality received Brigitte Young in 2016 the Käthe Leichter Prize of Austria.

== Membership in Boards, Panels and Committees ==
Young has worked extensively as an official expert and scientific advisor to state institutions and committees, such as the German parliament, and the European Commission. In 2000 she was appointed as an expert for a period of two years for the Enquete commission of the German parliament on "Globalization and the World Economy - Challenges and Answers" (Globalisierung der Weltwirtschaft - Herausforderungen und Antworten). Additionally she has been a member of the large EU-Network of Excellence, “Global Governance, Regionalisation, and Regulation: The Role of the EU” (GARNET) with 47 European universities and think tanks, as well as member of the Management Board (2005–2010). In 2007 Young was a member on the First Warwick Commission on “The Multilateral Trade Regime” (2007) which had the mandate to come up with recommendations for the World Trade Organization to conclude the Doha Development Round. In November 2011 Young was nominated by the Minister of European Affairs of North Rhine-Westphalia, Germany, and the University of Düsseldorf to advise the state government on the regional impact of the euro area crisis, and to work on possible recommendations to avoid an economic downturn. In addition she has worked for the European Commission in several projects as independent expert and consultant on issues related to innovative research on the 2008 financial crisis and policy responses. From 2010 to 2014 she was also a German delegate to the EU-COST project on "Systemic Risks, Financial Crises and Credit". Young is also a scientific advisor to the EU-funded multidisciplinary research group FESSUD (Financialization, Economy, Society, and Sustainable Development) since 2011.

Brigitte Young is on the editorial board of the Journal of Economic Policy Reform, the Internationalist Feminist Journal of Politics, Global Governance. A Review of Multilateralism and International Organizations, and on the editorial review board of the book series Global Political Economies of Gender and Sexuality. Moreover, she was a member of the scientific board of Attac.

== Publications ==
Selected books

- 2021 (reprint): Prospects for Soviet Grain Production, Routledge Paperback, ISBN 9780367299965
- 2019: Prospects for Soviet Grain Production, Routledge e-book, ISBN 9780429303258
- 2014: Financial Cultures and Crisis Dynamics, (edited with Bob Jessop und Christoph Scherrer), London/New York: Routledge, ISBN 978-1138776043.
- 2014: Financial Crisis: Causes, Policy responses, future Challenges. Outcomes of EU-funded research, European Commission, DG Research and Innovation. ISBN 978-92-79-36337-5.
- 2011: Questioning Financial Governance from a Feminist Perspective, (edited with Isabella Bakker and Diane Elson), London/New York: Routledge, ISBN 978-0415676700.
- 2010: Gender Knowledge and Knowledge Networks in International Political Economy (with Christoph Scherrer), Baden-Baden: Nomos, ISBN 978-3-8329-5238-9.
- 2007: The Political Economy of Trade in Services (GATS). Gender in EU and China. Baden-Baden: Nomos (In German: Die Politische Ökonomie des Dienstleistungsabkommens (GATS). Gender in EU und China), ISBN 978-3832926007.
- 2002: Global Governance. Gewerkschaften und NGOs – Akteure für Gerechtigkeit und Solidarität (Global Governance. Labor Unions and NGOs – Actors for Justice and Solidarity) (with Christopher Flavin, Christoph Scherrer and Klaus Zwickel), Hamburg: VSA, ISBN 978-3879758463.
- 2001: Gender, Globalization and Democratization (edited with Rita Mae Kelly, Jane H. Bayes and Mary Hawkesworth), Lanham/MD: Rowman and Littlefield Publ.
- 1999: Triumph of the Fatherland: German Unification and the Marginalization of Women, Ann Arbor/MI: The University of Michigan Press, ISBN 978-0472109487.
- 1983: Prospects for Soviet Grain Production, Boulder/CO: Westview Press, ISBN 978-0865319875.

Selected articles in books and journals

- 2022 (forthcoming): Covid 19 and the Gender Dilemma: Blind Spots in both Macroeconomics and Feminist Economics, ‘Handbook on Critical Political Economy and Public Policy’ ed. Anna Garcia, Christoph Scherrer, Joscha Wullweber, Cheltenham, UK: Edward Elgar Publishing.
- 2022: Ukraine’s oligarchs must share the cost of reconstruction too, Financial Times, 19. April 2022, pg. 16
- 2021: Kritische ökonomische Politikberatung als Seiltanz? In: H. Krämer und J. Schmidt, Wirtschaftspolitische Beratung in der Krise. Schriften der Keynes-Gesellschaft. Marburg: Metropolis, 39-57
- 2021: Bitte kein Genderwashing. Die Care-Ökonomie ist kein ‚Frauenthema‘. Sie muss im Kontext des globalen Finanzsystems betrachtet werden. IPG. 15. Juli.
- 2021: Covid-19. Women and the Economy – it’s not all about Care, in Social Europe Dossier
- 2020: A Macro-Level Account of Money and Credit to Explain Gendered Financialization. New Political Economy. Vol. 25:6: 944-956.
- 2020: From Sick Man of Europe to the German Economic Power House. Two Narratives: Ordoliberalism versus Euro-Currency Regime, German Politics. Vol. 29:3 (Sept. 2020): 464-478
- 2020: Roundtable: Monetary Policy in the EU. The Distributive Impact of Central Banks’ Quantitative Easing Program.
- 2020: European economic, fiscal, and social policy at the crossroads, (with Francesco Saraceno and Willi Semmler), Constellations, 2020: 1-21.
- 2020: No Gender Please, We’re Central Bankers: Distributional Impacts of Quantitative Easing (with Martina Metzger). Working Paper 136/2020, Berlin School of Economics and Law.
- 2019: Haben Ostfrauen heute noch einen nachweisbaren ökonomischen Vorteil gegenüber Westfrauen? Femina politica, 02/2019: 136-139.
- 2019: The Enigma of German Ordoliberalism: Is there a Future for a European Social Market Economy? Malte Dold and Tim Krieger (ed.), Ordoliberalism and European Economic Policy. Between Realpolitik and Economic Utopia, London/New York: Routledge 223-236.
- 2019: Eine solidarische EU: Wie Können Fiskal- und Sozialunion konzipiert werden? (mit Willi Semmler) eds. Hans-Jürgen Bieling/Simon Guntrum, Neue Segel, alter Kurs? Die Eurokrise und ihre Folgen für das europäische Wirtschaftsregieren, Wiesbaden: Springer VS, 229-250.
- 2018: Das schwierige Verhältnis zwischen Finanzökonomik und Genderstudies, lunapark21: Zeitschrift zur Kritik der globalen Ökonomie. 44, 2018: 25-27.
- 2018: Financialization, Unconventional Monetary Policy and Gender Inequality, Handbook on the IPE of Gender, ed. Juanita Elias and Adrianne Roberts, Cheltenham, UK: Edward Elgar, 241-251.
- 2017: Re-Booting Europe: What kind of Fiscal Union – What kind of Social Union (with Willi Semmler), in: Saving the EURO – Redesigning Euro Area Economic Governance, eds. Hansjörg Herr, Jan Priewe, Andrew Watt, London: Social Publishing, 223-249.
- 2017: Das Hijacking des Ordoliberalismus: Wie konnte es dazu kommen und wie könnte eine inklusive Europäische Soziale Marktwirtschaft aussehen? Hrsg. Baden-Badener Unternehmer Gespräche (BBUG), Wilfried-Guth-Stiftungslehrstuhl, Albert-Ludwigs-Universität Freiburg, Der Ordoliberalismus: Chance oder Gefahr für Europa, München: Ch. Goetz Verlag, 71-83.
- 2016: Entgrenzung der globalen Handels- und Finanzmärkte, Shalini Randeria (ed.,) Border Crossings. Zurich: vdf Hochschulverlag AG an der ETH Zurich, pp. 115–134.
- 2016: Die Unkonventionelle Geldpolitik der Zentralbanken und die Vermögensverzerrungen, eds. Jakob Kapeller, Stephan Pühringer and Katrin Hirte, Ökonomie! Welche Ökonomie? Zu Stand und Status der Wirtschaftswissenschaften", Marburg: Metropolis, S. 133-146.
- 2015: Review: „Challenges for Europe in the World, 2030,” ed. John Eatwell, Terry McKinley and Pascal Petit, Ashgate 2014, in: European Review of International Studies, 2015, Vol. 2:1: 2015: 130-133.
- 2015: The battle of ideas in the Eurozone crisis management: German ordoliberalism versus post-Keynesianism, in: Sebastiano Fadda and Pasquale Tridico, The Economic Crisis in Social and Institutional Context, London/New York: Routledge, 78-90.
- 2014: TTIP: The invisible Genderproblematique, Heinrich Böll Foundation, Berlin August 2014.
- 2014: Financial Stability as Imaginaries across Phases of Capitalism, Bob Jessop, Brigitte Young, Christoph Scherrer (eds), Financial Cultures and Crisis Dynamics, London/New York: Routledge, 145-161.
- 2014: The Power of German Ordoliberalism in the Eurozone Crisis Management, Daniel Daianu, Giorgio Basevi, Carlo D’Adda and Rajeesh Kumar (eds.), Eurozone Crisis and the Future of Europe, Houndmills: Palgrave Macmillan, 126-137.
- 2014: German Ordoliberalism as Agenda Setter for the Euro Crisis: Myth Trumps Reality, in: Journal of Comparative European Studies, Vol. 22:3: 276–287.
- 2013: Global Financial Regulation and Consumer Protection (with Dorothea Schäfer), in: Quarterly Journal of Economic Research, German Institute for Economics (DIW), eds. D. Schäfer, W. Semmler, B. Young, Sustainable European Politics of Consolidation- Chances and Challenges, 82:4:2013: 45–56.
- 2013: Introduction: From the Dominance of the Financial Sector to a Sustainable European Politics of Consolidation (authors: D. Schäfer, W. Semmler, B. Young), in: Quarterly Journal of Economic Research, German Institute for Economics (DIW), ed. D. Schäfer, W. Semmler, B. Young, Sustainable European Politics of Consolidation- Chances and Challenges, 82:4:2013: 5–13.
- 2013: Reflections on Werner Bonefeld’s ‘Freedom and the Strong State: On German Ordoliberalism’ and the Continuing Importance of the Ideas of Ordoliberalism to Understand Germany’s (Contested) Role in Resolving the Euro Zone Crisis, (Volker Berghahn/Brigitte Young) In: New Political Economy, Vol. 18:5: 768–778.
- 2013: Financialization, Neoliberalism and the German Ordoliberalism in the EU-Crisis Management, in: Marcel Heires/Andreas Nölke, Politische Ökonomie der Finanzialisierung (The Political Economy of Financialization), Wiesbaden: Springer VS, 63-77.
- 2013: Ordoliberalism - Neoliberalism - Laissez-Faire-Liberalism, in: Joscha Wullweber, Antonia Graf, Maria Behrens (eds.), Theorien der Internationalen Politischen Ökonomie (Theories of International Political Economy). Wiesbaden: SpringerVS, 33-48.
- 2013: Between Expectations and Reality: A Critical Assessment of the G20 Financial Market and Economic Reforms, Special Issue: Hans-Jürgen Bieling, Tobias Haas, Julia Lux (Hrsg), The International Political Economy after the World Financial Crisis, In: Zeitschrift für Außen- und Sicherheitspolitik, Vol. 6, Suppl. 1: 161-178 (in German).
- 2013: The Exclusion of Feminist Positions in the Euro Crisis-Regulation and its Impacts: A Feminist-Economic Explanation, in: M. Jansen, A. Röming, M. Rohde (eds.), Men Women Future. A Genderguide. A Special Edition for the Central Office for Political Education. München: Olzog Verlag, p. 189-208.
- 2013: Gender, debt, and the housing/financial crisis, Figart, Deborah M. and Tonia L. Warnecke, (eds.) Handbook of Research on Gender and Economic Life, Cheltenham, UK: Edward Elgar, 378-390.
- 2013: Structural Power and the Gender-Biases of the Technocratic Network Governance in Finance, in: Gülay Caglar, Elisabeth Prügl, Susanne Zwingel (eds.), Feminist Strategies in International Governance, New York/London: Routledge, pp. 267–282.
- 2013: Macroeconomic Links between Finance – Trade – Gender, in: Gabriele Wilde/Stefanie Friederich (eds.,) Disciplinary Focus, Gender and Gender Relations in Scientific Analysis, Münster: Westfälisches Dampfboot, 90-106 (in German).
- 2012: Global Financial Markets: Fairness and Justice, in: Klaus Kraemer, Sebastian Nessel (ed.). Entfesselte Finanzmärkte. Soziologische Analysen des Modernen Kapitalismus. Frankfurt: Campus, 387-402 (in German).
- 2012: Two Separate Worlds? Financial Economics and Gender Studies, in: Ingrid Kurz-Scherf/ Alexandra Scheele (in German: Zwei getrennte Welten? Finanzökonomie und Geschlechterforschung), Power or Economic Law? The Relationship between Crisis and Gender, Münster: Westfälisches Dampfboot,36-51.
- 2011: The European Sovereign Debt Crisis. Is Germany to Blame? In: German Politics and Society, Issue 98, Vol. 29:1 (Spring 2011), 1-24 (with Willi Semmler).
- 2011: The Role of Gender in Governance of the Financial Sector (with Helene Schuberth), in Brigitte Young, Isabella Bakker, and Diane Elson (eds): Questioning Financial Governance From a Feminist Perspective, London/New York: Routledge IAFFE Advances in Feminist Economics 2011: 132–154.
- 2011: "Neoliberalism." International Encyclopedia of Political Science. Ed. Bertrand Badie, Dirk Berg-Schlosser, and Leonardo Morlino. Thousand Oaks, CA: SAGE, 2011. 1677–80.
- 2011: Privatized Keynesianism, the financialization of daily-life and the debt trap (Der privatisierte Keynesianismus, die Finanzialisierung des alltäglichen Lebens und die Schuldenfalle, in: Oliver Kessler (Hrsg) Die Politische Ökonomie der Weltfinanzkrise, (The Political Economy of the World Financial Crisis) Wiesbaden: VS-Verlag. 2011: 15–36.
- 2010: Introduction: Gender Knowledge and Knowledge Networks in International Political Economy in: Brigitte Young/Christoph Scherrer (eds.)., Gender Knowledge and Knowledge Networks in International Economy, Baden-Baden: Nomos (mit Christoph Scherrer), pp. 9–17.
- 2010: From Microcredit to Microfinance to Inclusive Finance: A Response to Global Financial Openness, in: Geoffrey R.D. Underhill, Jasper Blom, Daniel Muegge (eds.), Global Financial Integration Thirty Years On, Cambridge: Cambridge University Press, 256-269.
- 2010: Lost in Temptation of Risk: Financial Market Liberalization, Financial Melt-Down and Policy Reactions (with Willi Semmler) 2010 in: Comparative European Politics, Vol. 8:3: 327–353.
- 2010: The Global Financial Meltdown and the Impact of Financial Governance on Gender (with Helene Schuberth), 2010: GARNET Policy Brief, Paris: Science Politique, 1-12

Selected articles in popular press

- Es gibt keinen Widerspruch zwischen dem Markt und einem sozialen Europa, Gegen Blende, 18. September 2012.
- The truth about the eurozone crisis, Public Service Europe, 20 September 2011
- What does Shareholder-Value Mean? In: Die Tageszeitung, March 8, 2004, pg. 16.
- Perspectives for Women after Cancun. In: Zweiwochendienst. Frauen and Politik. No. 201/2003: 14–15.
- Globalization – What To Do About It? (Globalisierung – Was Tun?, in: AEP Information, Feministische Zeitschrift für Politik und Gesellschaft, 4/2002: 7 – 9.
- Women as Economic Factor. Growth is female! In: Wirtschaftsspiegel, September 1, 2002: 12–14.
- Economic Potential Women. Growth is female. In: Wirtschaftsreport Siegen, 12/2002: 2–6.

== See also ==
- Feminist economics
- List of feminist economists
- List of political scientists
