= Otto Suhr Institute for Political Science =

Research institute of the Free University of Berlin

- Otto-Suhr-Institut für Politikwissenschaft
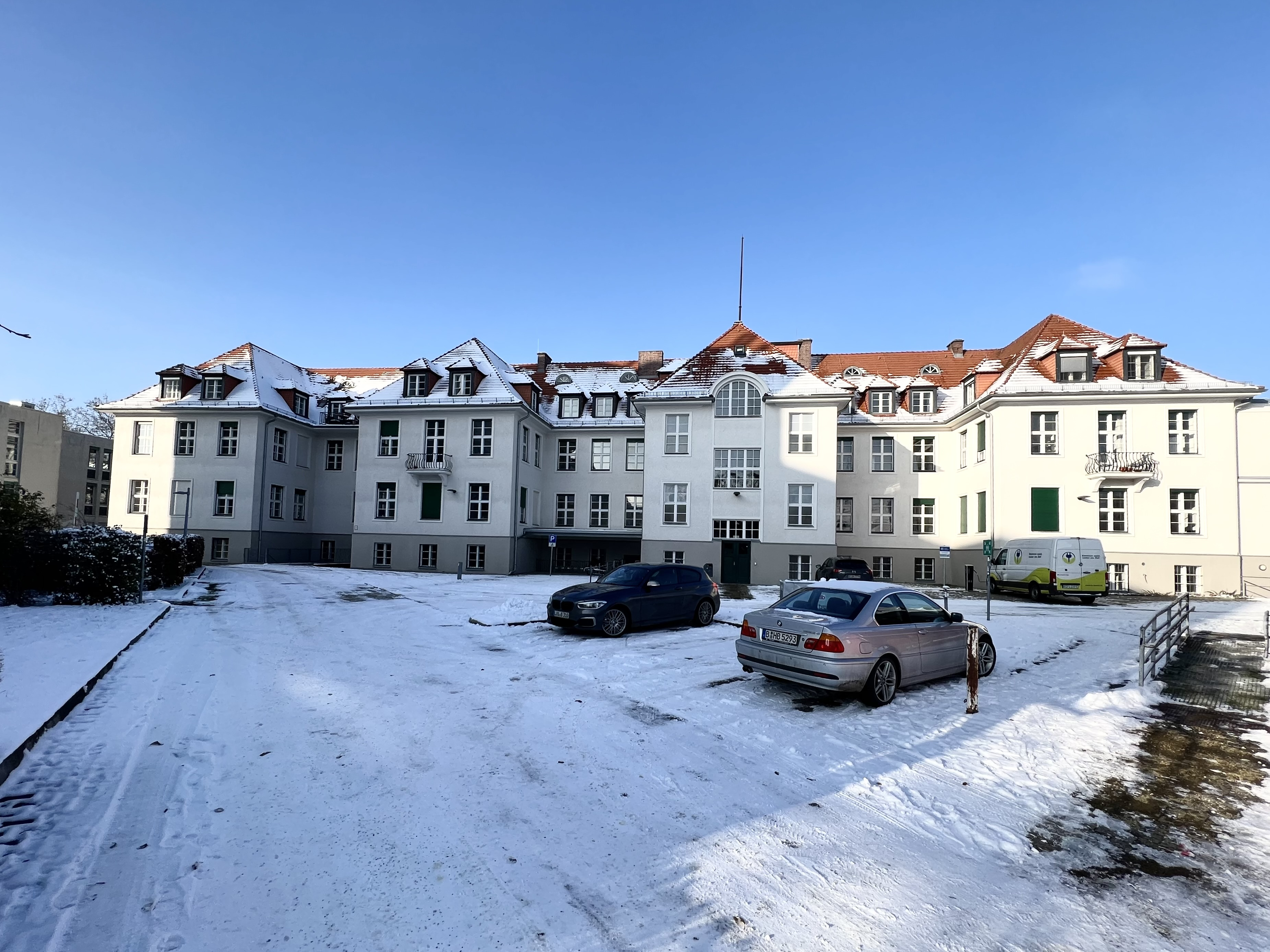
- Type: Institute
- Established: 1959 (1920)
- Affiliations: Freie Universität Berlin
- Dean: Tanja Börzel
- Location: Berlin, Berlin, Germany; 52°26′56″N 13°16′37″E
- Website: www.polsoz.fu-berlin.de/en/polwiss/index.html

The Otto Suhr Institute for Political Science (Otto-Suhr-Institut für Politikwissenschaft, short OSI) is a research institute of the Free University of Berlin. It is the leading academic institution for political science in Germany, and one of the most highly rated in the world. It is named after Otto Suhr, a former mayor of Berlin and is the successor of the German Academy for Politics.

The OSI's undergraduate and graduate programs in political science are consistently ranked the best in Germany and among the best in Europe. It is part of the Free University of Berlin’s Department of Political and Social Science, and offers dual degree programs with Sciences Po and HEC Paris. It is the most selective department for political science degrees in Germany.

== History ==
The OSI arose in 1959 from the Deutsche Hochschule für Politik (German Academy for Politics) founded in 1920, which was the leading educational institution for the Weimar Republic’s political elites. Otto Suhr (1894–1957; SPD) a professor at the institute who would later become mayor of Berlin, envisioned an institute for the teaching of democracy. The opening ceremony was hosted by Theodor Heuss, then President of Germany, who proclaimed "the breath of the world will blow through the doors of this institution".

The Otto-Suhr-Institut played a significant role in the German student movement in the late 1960s, as it became a place of political confrontation between traditional and socialist forces regarding the restructuring of the German university system. While the institute at one point employed some of the most prominent leftist thinkers, such as Johannes Agnoli, it has distanced itself from any political leanings in the late 20th and early 21st century.

== Academics ==
The OSI is part of the Free University of Berlin’s Department of Political and Social Sciences, focusing on the study of international relations. Since 2001, Thomas Risse has headed the institute's Centre for Transnational Relations, Foreign and Security Policy which was founded in 1986 as the Centre for Transatlantic Foreign and Security Policy by Helga Haftendorn.

=== Study Programmes ===
The Otto-Suhr-Institut offer the following undergraduate and graduate study programmes:

- BA Political Science
- BA Political Science for Education
- BA in political science, in partnership with Sciences Po
- MA Political Science
- MA Gender, Intersectionality and Politics
- MA International Relations
- MA Political Science - European Affairs, in partnership with Sciences Po
- MA Political Science - International Affairs, in partnership with Sciences Po
- MA Public Policy and Management, in partnership with HEC Paris
- MA International Relations, in partnership with the Humboldt University of Berlin and the University of Potsdam
- MA International Relations, in partnership with the Humboldt University, the University of Potsdam and the Moscow State Institute of International Relations (discontinued since 2021)

=== International programmes ===
The institute offers an integrated German-French dual bachelor's degree as well as a dual master's degree programme with the Institut d’Études Politiques de Paris (the French grande école also known as Sciences Po), and offered a joint German-Russian master's degree programme in co-operation with the Moscow State Institute of International Relations until the Russian invasion of Ukraine in 2022. It also offers a dual degree in Public Policy and Management with HEC Paris (a famed French grande école and business school). The German-French dual degree programmes are recognised and coordinated by the Franco-German University.

The OSI also maintains several academic exchange agreements with top-ranking universities around the globe.

== Notable faculty ==
- Johannes Agnoli, political scientist
- Elmar Altvater, political scientist
- Arnulf Baring, historian and political scientist
- Tanja Börzel, European integration and governance scholar
- Herta Däubler-Gmelin, former German Minister of Justice
- Nils Diederich, political scientist and member of the Social Democratic Party of Germany
- Thorsten Faas, political scientist
- Jürgen W. Falter, political scientist
- Ernst Fraenkel, political scientist
- Ossip K. Flechtheim, political scientist and futurist scholar
- Roman Herzog, former president of Germany
- Axel Honneth, philosopher
- Eva Kreisky, political scientist and jurist
- Alexandre Kum’a Ndumbe, historian and scholar
- Bernd Ladwig, political philosopher
- Richard Löwenthal, journalist and political scientist
- Elisabeth Noelle-Neumann, political scientist
- Bohdan Osadchuk, historian and journalist
- Ulrich K. Preuss, political scientist and jurist
- Thomas Risse, international relations scholar
- Gerhard A. Ritter, historian
- Michaele Schreyer, former European Commissioner and member of the German Green Party
- Klaus Schroeder, political scientist and historian
- Gesine Schwan, political scientist and member of the Social Democratic Party of Germany
- Klaus Segbers, political scientist and scholar
- Richard Stöss, political scientist
- Heinrich August Winkler, historian
- Brigitte Young, political economist
- Christoph Zürcher, political scientist

== Notable alumni ==
- Reem Alabali-Radovan, politician
- Béla Anda, journalist
- Jakob Augstein, journalist and publishing heir
- Dorothee Bär, politician
- Arnulf Baring, historian and political scientist
- Björn Böhning, former state secretary
- Frank Bsirske, politician and trade unionist
- Sawsan Chebli, politician
- Annette Dittert, journalist and filmmaker
- Jürgen W. Falter, political scientist
- Ullrich Fichtner, journalist
- Hermann L. Gremniza, journalist
- Bettina Jarasch, politician and Berlin senator
- Christiane Lemke, politician and political scientist
- Heinrich Lummer, former senator and mayor of Berlin
- Lorenz Maroldt, editor-in-chief of Der Tagesspiegel
- Alfred Mechtersheimer, former member of the Bundestag
- Walter Momper, former mayor of Berlin and president of the Bundesrat
- Arend Oetker, businessman, politician and former president of the German Council of Foreign Relations
- Gerhard A. Ritter, historian
- Hermann Scheer, politician and environmentalist
- Otto Schily, former German Minister of the Interior
- Swen Schulz, former member of the Bundestag
- Gesine Schwan, professor of political science
- Michael Sommer, trade unionist
- Gabor Steingart, journalist and former editor-in-chief of Handelsblatt
- Anne Will, TV journalist
- Brigitte Young, political economist
- Helga Zepp-LaRouche, political activist of the LaRouche movement and founder of the Schiller Institute
