= Berlin-Spandau – Charlottenburg North =

Federal electoral district of Germany

77 Berlin-Spandau – Charlottenburg North
- Berlin-Spandau – Charlottenburg Nord
- Electoral district for the Bundestag
- Berlin-Spandau – Charlottenburg North in 2025
- State: Berlin
- Population: 272,000 (2019)
- Electorate: 180,251 (2021)
- Area: 99.5 km^{2}

Current electoral district
- Created: 1990
- Party: SPD
- Member: Helmut Kleebank
- Elected: 2021, 2025

Berlin-Spandau – Charlottenburg North (German: Berlin-Spandau – Charlottenburg Nord) is an electoral constituency (German: Wahlkreis) represented in the Bundestag. It elects one member via first-past-the-post voting. Under the current constituency numbering system, it is designated as constituency 77. It is located in western Berlin, comprising the Spandau borough.

Berlin-Spandau – Charlottenburg North was created for the inaugural 1990 federal election after German reunification. Since 2021, it has been represented by Helmut Kleebank of the Social Democratic Party (SPD).

== Geography ==
Berlin-Spandau – Charlottenburg North is located in western Berlin. As of the 2021 federal election, it comprises the entirety of the Spandau borough as well as small parts of Charlottenburg-Wilmersdorf, specifically the locality of Charlottenburg-Nord and the neighbourhood of Kalowswerder from Charlottenburg locality.

== History ==
Berlin-Spandau – Charlottenburg North was created after German reunification in 1990, then known as Berlin-Spandau. It acquired its current name in the 2002 election. In the 1990 election, it was constituency 251 in the numbering system. In the 1994 and 1998 elections, it was number 252. In the 2002 through 2009 elections, it was number 79. In the 2013 through 2021 elections, it was number 78. From the 2025 election, it has been number 77. Originally, the constituency was coterminous with the borough of Spandau. In the 2002 election, it gained the area of Charlottenburg-Wilmersdorf north of the Spree.

== Members ==
The constituency was first represented by Peter Kittelmann of the Christian Democratic Union (CDU) from 1990 to 1994, followed by Heinrich Lummer from 1994 to 1998. It was won by the Social Democratic Party (SPD) in 1998 and represented by Wolfgang Behrendt until 2002, followed by Swen Schulz until 2009. Kai Wegner of the CDU was elected in 2009 and re-elected in 2013. Former member Schulz regained the constituency in the 2017 election. He was succeeded by Helmut Kleebank in 2021, who was re-elected in 2025.

Election	Member	Party	%
1990	Peter Kittelmann	CDU	50.6
1994	Heinrich Lummer	CDU	43.3
1998	Wolfgang Behrendt	SPD	49.9
2002	Swen Schulz	SPD	44.1
2005	Swen Schulz	SPD	46.8
2009	Kai Wegner	CDU	36.5
2013	Kai Wegner	CDU	39.2
2017	Swen Schulz	SPD	32.1
2021	Helmut Kleebank	SPD	32.8
2025	Helmut Kleebank	SPD	27.5

== Election results ==
=== 2025 election ===
Federal election (2025): Berlin-Spandau – Charlottenburg North
Notes:	Blue background denotes the winner of the electorate vote. Pink background denotes a candidate elected from their party list. Yellow background denotes an electorate win by a list member, or other incumbent. A ✓ or ✗ denotes status of any incumbent, win or lose respectively.						
Party	Candidate	Votes	%	±%	Party votes	%	±%
SPD	✓ Helmut Kleebank	36,200	27.5	▼5.1	24,296	18.4	▼9.0
CDU	Bernhard Schodrowski	34,305	26.1	▲2.2	31,440	23.8	▲2.0
AfD	Andreas Otti	25,931	19.7	▲9.3	25,305	19.1	▲8.5
Left	Hans-Ulrich Riedel	15,044	11.4	▲6.0	17,071	12.9	▲7.9
Greens	Gollaleh Ahmadi	12,217	9.3	▼2.4	14,625	11.1	▼3.3
BSW					7,913	6.0	New
FDP	Dominik Hamann	4,283	3.3	▼5.1	5,208	3.9	▼5.9
Tierschutzpartei					2,765	2.1	▼1.4
PARTEI	Rhavin Grobert	3,128	2.4	▲0.4	1,063	0.8	▼0.8
Volt					902	0.7	▲0.2
Team Todenhöfer					433	0.3	▼1.2
FW					409	0.3	▼0.6
PdF					255	0.2	New
BD					160	0.1	New
MERA25					146	0.1	New
MLPD	Gernot Wolfer	412	0.3	▲0.2	96	0.1	0.0
BüSo					49	0.0	0.0
SGP					34	0.0	0.0
Informal votes		1,789			1,139		
Total valid votes		131,520			132,170		
Turnout		133,309	75.5	▲7.2			
SPD hold	Majority	1,895	1.4	▼7.9			

=== 2021 election ===
Federal election (2021): Berlin-Spandau – Charlottenburg North
Notes:	Blue background denotes the winner of the electorate vote. Pink background denotes a candidate elected from their party list. Yellow background denotes an electorate win by a list member, or other incumbent. A ✓ or ✗ denotes status of any incumbent, win or lose respectively.						
Party	Candidate	Votes	%	±%	Party votes	%	±%
SPD	Helmut Kleebank	40,451	32.8	▲0.7	34,233	27.7	▲5.0
CDU	Joe Chialo	28,904	23.5	▼7.4	26,266	21.3	▼6.8
Greens	Steffen Laube	14,680	11.9	▲5.8	17,963	14.5	▲6.1
AfD	Lukas Garnis	12,447	10.1	▼3.3	12,783	10.3	▼3.8
FDP	Dominik Znanewitz	10,492	8.5	▲2.2	12,491	10.1	▲0.2
Left	Evrim Sommer	6,771	5.5	▼2.1	6,353	5.1	▼4.6
Tierschutzpartei	Aida Castañeda	4,381	3.6		4,252	3.4	▲1.8
Team Todenhöfer					1,968	1.6	
PARTEI	Rhavin Grobert	2,455	2.0	▼0.5	1,922	1.6	▼0.2
dieBasis	Philipp Zühlke	1,693	1.4				
Die Grauen					1,623	1.3	▲0.7
FW					1,122	0.9	▲0.6
Volt					568	0.5	
Pirates					481	0.4	▼0.3
Gesundheitsforschung					382	0.3	▲0.1
ÖDP	Jens-Eberhard Jahn	278	0.2	▼0.5	239	0.2	▼0.1
Humanists					226	0.2	
Bündnis 21	Michael Dönicke	205	0.1				
Independent	Lucia Bunte	182	0.1				
du.					167	0.1	0.0
NPD					124	0.1	
LKR	Nicole Jädicke	121	0.1		88	0.1	
V-Partei3					93	0.1	▼0.1
DKP					57	0.0	0.0
BüSo					51	0.0	0.0
MLPD	Esther Engel	97	0.1	▼0.1	49	0.0	▼0.1
SGP					28	0.0	0.0
Informal votes		3,394			3,022		
Total valid votes		123,157			123,529		
Turnout		126,551	70.2	▼1.8			
SPD hold	Majority	11,547	9.3	▲8.1			

=== 2017 election ===
Federal election (2017): Berlin-Spandau – Charlottenburg North
Notes:	Blue background denotes the winner of the electorate vote. Pink background denotes a candidate elected from their party list. Yellow background denotes an electorate win by a list member, or other incumbent. A ✓ or ✗ denotes status of any incumbent, win or lose respectively.						
Party	Candidate	Votes	%	±%	Party votes	%	±%
SPD	Swen Schulz	41,965	32.1	▼5.3	29,733	22.7	▼6.1
CDU	✗ Kai Wegner	40,372	30.9	▼8.3	36,712	28.1	▼8.5
AfD	Andreas Otti	17,551	13.4	▲9.1	18,481	14.1	▲8.3
Left	Manuel Lambers	9,861	7.6	▲0.4	12,780	9.8	▲0.3
FDP	Sven Paul Fresdorf	8,292	6.4	▲5.0	12,927	9.9	▲6.1
Greens	Bettina Jarasch	8,031	6.2	▲1.5	11,063	8.5	▲0.2
PARTEI	Rhavin Grobert	3,224	2.5		2,247	1.7	▲0.9
Tierschutzpartei					2,147	1.6	
Pirates					862	0.7	▼2.4
Die Grauen					807	0.6	
ÖDP	Jens-Eberhard Jahn	998	0.8		386	0.3	▲0.1
BGE					380	0.3	
FW					377	0.3	▼0.1
DM					331	0.3	
DiB					310	0.3	
Gesundheitsforschung					294	0.2	
Menschliche Welt					232	0.2	
V-Partei³					208	0.2	
du.					175	0.1	
MLPD	Chaker Akari	280	0.2		152	0.1	0.0
BüSo					59	0.0	▼0.1
SGP					33	0.0	0.0
DKP					30	0.0	
B*					21	0.0	
Informal votes		2,435			2,262		
Total valid votes		130,574			130,747		
Turnout		133,009	72.0	▲2.4			
SPD gain from CDU	Majority	1,593	1.2				

=== 2013 election ===
Federal election (2013): Berlin-Spandau – Charlottenburg North
Notes:	Blue background denotes the winner of the electorate vote. Pink background denotes a candidate elected from their party list. Yellow background denotes an electorate win by a list member, or other incumbent. A ✓ or ✗ denotes status of any incumbent, win or lose respectively.						
Party	Candidate	Votes	%	±%	Party votes	%	±%
CDU	✓ Kai Wegner	50,071	39.2	▲2.8	46,757	36.6	▲6.6
SPD	Swen Schulz	47,790	37.4	▲4.2	36,932	28.9	▲5.4
Left	Monika Merk	9,199	7.2	▼2.1	12,146	9.5	▼1.5
Greens	Christoph Sonnenberg-Westeson	5,942	4.7	▼4.1	10,542	8.2	▼5.0
AfD	Sascha Paulick	5,543	4.3		7,458	5.8	
Pirates	Frank Thiesen	4,030	3.2		3,960	3.1	▲0.5
NPD	Jürgen Bolte	2,022	1.6	▼0.4	1,815	1.4	▼0.3
FDP	Sven Paul Fresdorf	1,788	1.4	▼7.2	4,856	3.8	▼10.9
PARTEI					1,038	0.8	
FW		555	0.4		550	0.4	
PRO					494	0.4	
BIG		553	0.4		460	0.4	
REP					310	0.2	▼0.3
ÖDP					224	0.2	0.0
BüSo		270	0.2	▼0.8	164	0.1	▼0.3
MLPD					85	0.1	0.0
PSG					55	0.0	0.0
Informal votes		2,722			2,639		
Total valid votes		127,763			127,846		
Turnout		130,485	69.6	▲0.9			
CDU hold	Majority	2,281	1.8	▼1.4			

=== 2009 election ===
Federal election (2009): Berlin-Spandau – Charlottenburg North
Notes:	Blue background denotes the winner of the electorate vote. Pink background denotes a candidate elected from their party list. Yellow background denotes an electorate win by a list member, or other incumbent. A ✓ or ✗ denotes status of any incumbent, win or lose respectively.						
Party	Candidate	Votes	%	±%	Party votes	%	±%
CDU	Kai Wegner	44,994	36.4	▲0.8	37,170	30.0	▲0.6
SPD	✗ Swen Schulz	41,051	33.2	▼13.6	29,109	23.5	▼12.8
Left	Monika Merk	11,446	9.3	▲3.7	13,611	11.0	▲3.7
Greens	Christoph Sonnenberg-Westeson	10,853	8.8	▲4.1	16,451	13.3	▲2.7
FDP	Kai Gersch	10,612	8.6	▲4.5	18,277	14.7	▲4.9
Pirates					3,173	2.6	
NPD	Sebastian Thom	2,463	2.0	▲0.7	1,982	1.6	▲0.4
Tierschutzpartei					2,019	1.6	
REP					618	0.5	▼0.5
BüSo	Horst Kreil	1,245	1.0	0.0	560	0.5	▲0.2
Independent	Titus-Ivo Kaute	752	0.6				
DIE VIOLETTEN					371	0.3	
ÖDP					226	0.2	
DVU					184	0.1	
MLPD	Felix Weitenhagen	285	0.2		96	0.1	0.0
PSG					87	0.1	0.0
DKP					44	0.0	
Informal votes		3,098			2,821		
Total valid votes		123,701			123,978		
Turnout		126,799	68.7	▼7.5			
CDU gain from SPD	Majority	3,943	3.2				

=== 2005 election ===
Federal election (2005):Berlin-Spandau – Charlottenburg North
Notes:	Blue background denotes the winner of the electorate vote. Pink background denotes a candidate elected from their party list. Yellow background denotes an electorate win by a list member, or other incumbent. A ✓ or ✗ denotes status of any incumbent, win or lose respectively.						
Party	Candidate	Votes	%	±%	Party votes	%	±%
SPD	✓ Swen Schulz	64,119	46.8	▲2.6	49,797	36.2	▼1.5
CDU	Kai Wegner	48,791	35.6	▼3.4	40,351	29.4	▼5.6
Left	Jörg Kuhle	7,608	5.6	▲3.5	9,983	7.3	▲4.9
Greens	Elisabeth Paus	6,347	4.6	▼1.2	14,485	10.5	▼0.6
FDP	Kai Gersch	5,562	4.1	▼1.4	13,593	9.9	▲2.0
GRAUEN					4,444	3.2	▲2.0
NPD	Hans-Joachim Klein	1,733	1.3	▲0.7	1,703	1.2	▲0.8
REP	Olaf Neitzel	1,515	1.1	▼0.1	1,314	1.0	0.0
BüSo	Wolfgang Lillge	1,349	1.0		301	0.2	▲0.1
Feminist					651	0.5	▲0.1
PARTEI					497	0.4	
SGP					117	0.1	
APPD					109	0.1	
MLPD					96	0.1	
Informal votes		3,480			3,063		
Total valid votes		137,024			137,441		
Turnout		140,504	76.3	▼1.3			
SPD hold	Majority	15,328	11.2				
