= Peter Krauland =

Austrian politician (1903–1985)

Federal Minister for Asset Protection and Economic Planning
- In office 1945–1949

Personal details
- Born: 6 August 1903 Groß Sankt Florian, Austria-Hungary
- Died: 8 September 1985 (aged 82) Vienna, Austria
- Resting place: Hietzing Cemetery
- Party: ÖVP (1945–1951)
- Education: University of Vienna
- Occupation: Politician; businessman; lawyer

Peter Krauland (6 August 1903 – 8 September 1985) was an Austrian lawyer, politician and businessman.

== Early life ==
Krauland was born in 1903 in Groß Sankt Florian, Austria-Hungary.

From 1917 to 1921, Krauland studied at an Austrian Business School. He pursued law at the University of Vienna from 1926 to 1931, earning his doctorate in 1933. During this period, and until 1951, he was a member of the Catholic Student Association KÖStV.

== Political activity ==
From 1934 to 1938, during the period of Austrofascism, Krauland held various positions in the Government of the State of Styria, including State Financial Secretary and member of the State Council. After the Anschluss in 1938, Krauland was removed from his position by the Nazi regime for being a member of the previous government and imprisoned for an extended period.

=== Work as a federal minister ===
From December 1945 to October 1949, Peter Krauland served as the Minister of Property Management and Economic Planning for the Austrian People's Party (ÖVP). His department, colloquially known as the 'Ministry of Krauland,' was responsible for managing assets that belonged to Austrian organizations until 1938 and were confiscated during the Nazi regime.

== The Krauland Scandal ==
As a minister, Krauland was tasked with distributing property seized by the Nazi dictatorship, including printing houses, publishing houses, and other politically significant enterprises that were intended to be divided according to a Proporz system.

After it was revealed that the Guggenbach paper mill had made an agreement with the Austrian People’s Party (ÖVP), allegations of corruption arose, as the lease for the paper mill required a payment of 700,000 schillings to the ÖVP.

On January 30, 1951, the National Council's Committee on Immunity granted the Vienna Prosecutor's Office request to extradite the former Minister. He remained in Parliament as an independent member of Parliament until the National Council's term ended in 1953.

Krauland and several ministry officials were tried on corruption charges between January and July 1954. On July 6, 1954, the court ruled that Krauland had abused his official powers, causing damage to the state valued at over one million shillings. Yet, an Amnesty Law was passed in 1950, which made specific crimes committed before 1947 unpunishable, requiring the former minister to be acquitted.

== Death ==
Krauland died on September 8, 1985, in Vienna, Austria. He is buried at the Hietzing Cemetery.
