= Anneli Ute Gabanyi =

Romanian-born German political scientist, literary critic, journalist, and philologist

Anneli Ute Gabanyi (born 18 October 1942) is a German political scientist, literary critic, journalist, and philologist of Romanian background, especially known for her research on the society and culture of the Cold War period in Romania and the Romanian Revolution of 1989. A former main analyst for Südost-Institut in Munich, she is an associate researcher for the German Institute for International and Security Issues (Stiftung Wissenschaft und Politik) in Berlin.

== Biography ==
Born in Bucharest to a Transylvanian Saxon family of partly Hungarian heritage, she completed secondary studies in her parents' native town of Sibiu. As a former trader, her father was subjected to restrictions by Communist authorities, and the Gabanyi family residence in the Sub Arini neighbourghood of Sibiu was confiscated by the state.

Gabanyi studied Philology and Political Science at the University of Cluj, and later at the Université d'Auvergne and the University of Southern California. She received a PhD in Philology from the Helmut Schmidt University in Hamburg.

In 1963, Gabanyi and her family were allowed, as ethnic Germans, to reunite with their relatives living in West Germany (all of whom had retreated with the Wehrmacht from Northern Transylvania at the end of World War II). According to Anneli Ute Gabanyi, this was made possible by the efforts of her father, who had profited from détente in German-Romanian relations. They settled in Munich, where she became an analyst for Radio Free Europe (1969); she was head of the station's Romanian Research Section until 1987.

She has frequently visited her native country after the Revolution, and is a regular contributor to Sfera Politicii.

== Works ==
- Partei und Literatur in Rumänien seit 1945, München: R. Oldenbourg, 1975. ISBN 3-486-49201-2
- Die unvollendete Revolution: Rumänien zwischen Diktatur und Demokratie, München: Piper, 1990. ISBN 3-492-11271-4
- Systemwechsel in Rumänien: von der Revolution zur Transformation, München: R. Oldenbourg Verlag, 1998. ISBN 3-486-56377-7
- The Ceaușescu cult: propaganda and power policy in communist Romania, Bucharest: Editura Fundației Culturale Române, 2000. ISBN 973-577-280-9
- Vom Baltikum bis zum Schwarzen Meer. Transformationsstaaten im östlichen Europa, with Klaus Schroeder, München: Bayerische Landeszentrale für Politische Bildungsarbeit, 2002

== Honours ==
- (Romania) Romanian Royal Family: 56th Knight of the Royal Decoration of the Cross of the Romanian Royal House
