= Tanja Börzel =

German political scientist (born 1970)

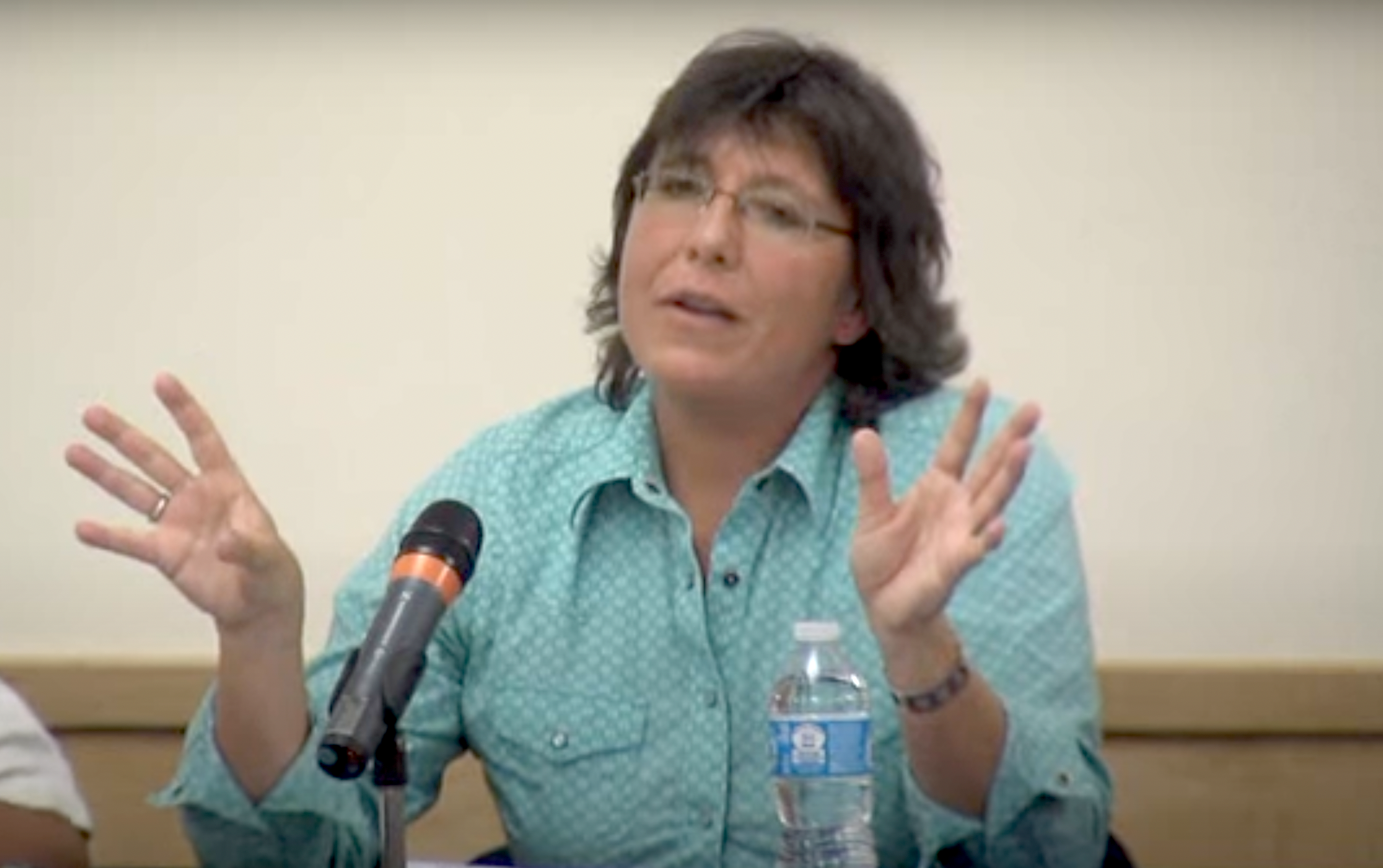
- Born: July 5, 1970; West-Germany
- Occupation: Political scientist
- Years active: 1999 ongoing
- Title: Professor
- Spouse: of course

Academic background
- Education: University of Konstanz

Academic work
- Discipline: Political science
- Sub-discipline: European Integration, Governance, and Diffusion
- Institutions: FU Berlin
- Main interests: European Integration, Governance, and Diffusion

Tanja A. Börzel (born 5 July 1970) is a German political scientist. Her research and teaching focus on the fields of European Integration, Governance, and Diffusion. She is professor of Political Science at the Otto-Suhr-Institute of Political Science of Freie Universität Berlin, director of the Center for European Integration, and holder of the Jean Monnet Chair for European Integration from 2006 until 2009. She is department chair of the Otto-Suhr-Institute of Political Science.

== Education ==
From 1989 to 1995, Börzel studied Political Science and Public Administration at the University of Konstanz. Subsequently, she obtained her PhD in Political and Social Sciences from the European University Institute in Florence. Her dissertation (“with distinction”), supervised by Adrienne Héritier, was entitled “The Domestic Impact of Europe: Institutional Adaptation in Germany and Spain”.

== Career ==
From 1999 to 2001, Börzel worked as coordinator for Environmental Studies at the Robert Schuman Centre for Advanced Studies of the European University Institute in Florence. Beginning in 1999 she was senior researcher for two years at the Max-Planck-Institute for Common Goods in Bonn. From 2002 to 2003 Börzel directed the junior research group on compliance with European law in member states funded by the Emmy Noether Programme of the German Research Foundation (DFG) at the Humboldt University. In 2003, she accepted the position as professor of International Politics and European Integration at the Department of Political Science of the University of Heidelberg, but soon joined the Otto-Suhr-Institute of Political Science of Freie Universität Berlin in December 2004.

From 2006 to 2007, Börzel was visiting professor at the Department of Government at Harvard University. From 2008 until 2016, she directed the DFG funded Research College “The Transformative Power of Europe”, together with Thomas Risse.

Tanja Börzel is also director of the Berlin Center for European Studies, which hosted the Jean Monnet Center of Excellence „Europe and its Citizens“. Between 2006 and 2012, she conducted several research projects in the Collaborative Research Center at the Sonderforschungsbereich 700 „Governance in Räumen begrenzter Staatlichkeit: Neue Formen des Regierens?“ (Governance in Areas of Limited Statehood: New Modes of Governance. From 2013 and 2021, she coordinated three research consortia funded by the EU, MAXCAP, EUSTRAT and EULISTCO.

Since 2018, she is director of the Cluster of Excellence „Contestations of the Liberal Script (SCRIPTS)“, together with Michael Zürn. SCRIPTS investigates why liberal ideas and institutions are increasingly contested, why, how, and to what effect.

She was advisor and evaluator of the dissertation of Governing Mayor of Berlin Franziska Giffey, that was found to be a plagiarism by the FU Berlin, with the degree being revoked in 2021.

== Research ==
Börzel's research focus and teaching experience lie in the field of European Integration, Governance, and Diffusion research. She concentrates on questions of institutional change as a result of Europeanization as well as on the diffusion of European ideas and policies within and outside the EU. She studies how and under what conditions the EU promotes institutions and policy programs in and outside of Europe, and what mechanisms of diffusion are applied. She researches global processes of diffusion and resulting transformational changes inside the EU and its member states. She writes about institutional effects of political, economic, and cultural processes of diffusion and the factors which promote or constrain processes of diffusion in the EU. In her recent research, she investigates the contestation of liberal norms, such as academic freedom, within democratic societies.

== Selected publications ==
Tanja A. Börzel has published a range of books, edited volumes, and articles including:

=== Monographs ===
- 2021. Effective Governance under Anarchy. Institutions, Legitimacy, and Social Trust in Areas of Limited Statehood, with Thomas Risse, Cambridge University Press.
- 2021. Why Noncompliance. The Politics of Law in the European Union. Ithaca, NY: Cornell University Press.
- 2003. Environmental Leaders and Laggards in Europe. Why There is (not) a Southern Problem. Aldershot, Burlington, Singapore, Sydney: Ashgate.
- 2002. States and Regions in the European Union. Institutional Adaptation in Germany and Spain. Cambridge: Cambridge University Press.

=== Edited volumes ===
- In prep. From Democracy Promotion to Resilience-Building in the EU’s Neighborhood. Special Issue of Democratization, co-edited with Thomas Risse and Eric Stollenwerk (accepted).
- 2021. The European Union and the Eastern Partnership Ten Years On. Special Issue of East European Politics, co-edited with Antoaneta Dimitrova and Dimiter Toshkov.
- 2021. Governance and Business-Society Relations in Areas of Limited Statehood. Special issue of Business & Society, co-edited with Sameer Azizi and Hans Krause Hansen.
- 2019. Peripheries in Competition? The Politics and Political Economy of Convergence and Divergence in the European Union. Special Issue of West European Politics 42(5), co-edited with Martin Rhodes and Rachel Epstein.
- 2019. European Integration Theory, 3rd ed., co-edited with Antje Wiener and Thomas Risse. Oxford University Press.
- 2018. The Oxford Handbook of Governance and Limited Statehood, co-edited with Thomas Risse and Anke Draude. Oxford: Oxford University Press.
- 2017. European Union Enlargement and Integration Capacity. Special Issue of Journal of European Public Policy 24 (2), co-edited with Antoaneta Dimitrova and Frank Schimmelfennig.
- 2017. Environmental Governance in South East Europe and the Western Balkans: Reassessing the Transformative Power of Europe. Special Issue of Environment and Planning C: Government and Policy 33 (5), co-edited with Adam Fagan.
- 2016. The Oxford Handbook of Comparative Regionalism, co-edited with Thomas Risse. Oxford: Oxford University Press.
- 2015. Governance Transfer by Regional Organizations, co-edited with Vera van Hüllen. Houndsmill: Palgrave.
- 2015. Responses to the Arab Spring – The EU in Comparative Perspective. Special Issue of the Journal of European Integration 37 (1), co-edited with Assem Dandashly and Thomas Risse.
- 2014. The Politics of International and Regional Diffusion. Presidential Issue of International Studies Review 16 (2), co-edited with Etel Solingen.
- 2013. Convergence without Accession? Explaining Policy Change in the EU’s Eastern Neighbourhood, Special Issue of Europe-Asia Studies 65 (4), co-edited with Julia Langbein, also published with Routledge, London: 2014.
- 2012. Business and Governance in South Africa, co-edited with Christian Thauer, Houndmills: Palgrave.
- 2012. Convergence without Accession? Explaining Policy Change in the EU's Eastern Neighbourhood, Special Issue of Europe-Asia Studies, co-edited with Julia Langbein.
- 2012. From Europeanization to Diffusion/, Special Issue of West European Politics, co-edited with Thomas Risse.
- 2012. Roads to Regionalism. Genesis, Design, and Effects of Regional Organizations, co-edited with Lukas Goltermann, Mathis Lohaus and Kai Striebinger. Aldershot: Ashgate.
- 2011. Wozu Staat? Governance in Räumen begrenzter und konsolidierter Staatlichkeit, co-edited with Marianne Beisheim, Philipp Genschel and Bernhard Zangl. Nomos: Baden-Baden.
- 2010. Civil Society on the Rise? EU Enlargement and Societal Mobilization in Central and Eastern Europe. Special Issue of Acta Politica.
- 2009. Coping with Accession to the European Union. New Modes of Environmental Governance. Houndmills: Palgrave Macmillan.
- 2006. The Disparity of European Integration. Revisiting Neofunctionalism in Honor of Ernst Haas. London: Routledge.
- 2003. Environmental Leaders and Laggards in Europe. Why There is (not) a Southern Problem. Aldershot, Burlington, Singapore, Sydney: Ashgate.
- 2002. States and Regions in the European Union. Institutional Adaptation in Germany and Spain. Cambridge: Cambridge University Press.

=== Journal articles (selection) ===
- 2021. Contestations of the Liberal International Order. From Liberal Multilateralism to Postnational Liberalism, co-authored with Michael Zürn. International Organizations, https://doi.org/10.1017/S0020818320000570.
- 2021. EU democracy projection: Does the EU practice what it preaches? Mediterranean Politics, https://doi.org/10.1080/13629395.2021.1915738.
- 2021. Towards Open Access Social Orders in Eastern Europe, co-authored with Dimiter Toshkov and Antoaneta Dimitrova. East European Politics, https://doi.org/10.1080/21599165.2021.1879793.
- 2020. Multilevel Governance or Multilevel Government? British Journal of Politics and International Relations, https://doi.org/10.1177%2F1369148120939872.
- 2020. Identity Politics, Core State Powers, and Regional Integration: Europe and Beyond, co-authored with Thomas Risse. Journal of Common Market Studies 58(1): 21-40.
- 2019. Grand Theories of Integration and the Challenges of Comparative Regionalism, co-authored with Thomas Risse. Journal of European Public Policy 26(8): 1231–1252.
- 2019. Varieties of Limited Access Orders: The Nexus Between Politics and Economics in Hybrid Regimes, co-authored with Esther Ademmer and Julia Langbein. Governance 33(1): 191–208.
- 2019. Core-periphery Disparities in Europe: Is There a Link Between Political and Economic Divergence?, co-authored with Julia Langbein. West European Politics 42(5): 941–964.
- 2019. Compliance with EU Environmental Law. The Iceberg is Melting, co-authored with Aron Buzogany. Environmental Politics 28(2): 315–341.
- 2018. Researching the EU (Studies) Into Demise? Journal of European Public Policy 25(3): 475–485.
- 2018. From the Euro to the Schengen Crises: European Integration Theories, Politicization, and Identity Politics, co-authored with Thomas Risse, Journal of European Public Policy 25(1): 83–108.
- 2017. Building Good (Enough) Governance in Post-conflict Societies and Areas of Limited Statehood: The European Union and the Western Balkans, co-authored with Sonja Grimm, Daedalus 141(1): 116–127.
- 2017. Coming Together or Drifting Apart? The EU's Political Integration Capacity in New Members, Accession Candidates, and Eastern Neighbourhood Countries, co-authored with Frank Schimmelfennig, Journal of European Public Policy 24 (2), 278–296.
- 2017. Larger and more Law-abiding? The Impact of Enlargement on Compliance in the European Union, co-authored with Ulrich Sedelmeier, Journal of European Public Policy 24 (2), 197–217.
- 2017. European Union Enlargement and Integration Capacity: Concepts, Findings, and Policy Implications, co-authored with Antoaneta Dimitrova and Frank Schimmelfennig, Journal of European Public Policy 24 (2), 157–176.
- 2017. Environmental governance in South East Europe/Western Balkans: Reassessing the Transformative Power of Europe, co-authored with Adam Fagan. In Environmental Policy and Planning C 33 (5), 885–900.
- 2017. The Transformative Power of Europe Beyond Enlargement: The EU's Performance in Promoting Democracy in Its Neighborhood, co-authored with Bidzina Lebandize, East European Politics 33 (1), 17–35.
- 2016. From EU Governance of Crisis to Crisis in EU Governance. Regulatory Failure, Redistributive Conflict, and Eurosceptic Publics, Journal of Common Market Studies. The JCMS Annual Review of the European Union in 201554 (S1), 8-23.
- 2016. Dysfunctional Institutions, Trust and Governance in Areas of Limited Statehood, co-authored with Thomas Risse. In Regulation and Governance 10 (2), 149–160.
- 2016. Theorizing Regionalism: Cooperation, Integration, and Governance. In Oxford Handbook of Comparative Regionalism, edited by Tanja A. Börzel and Thomas Risse. Oxford: Oxford University Press, 41–63.
