= Joe Chialo =

German singer and politician

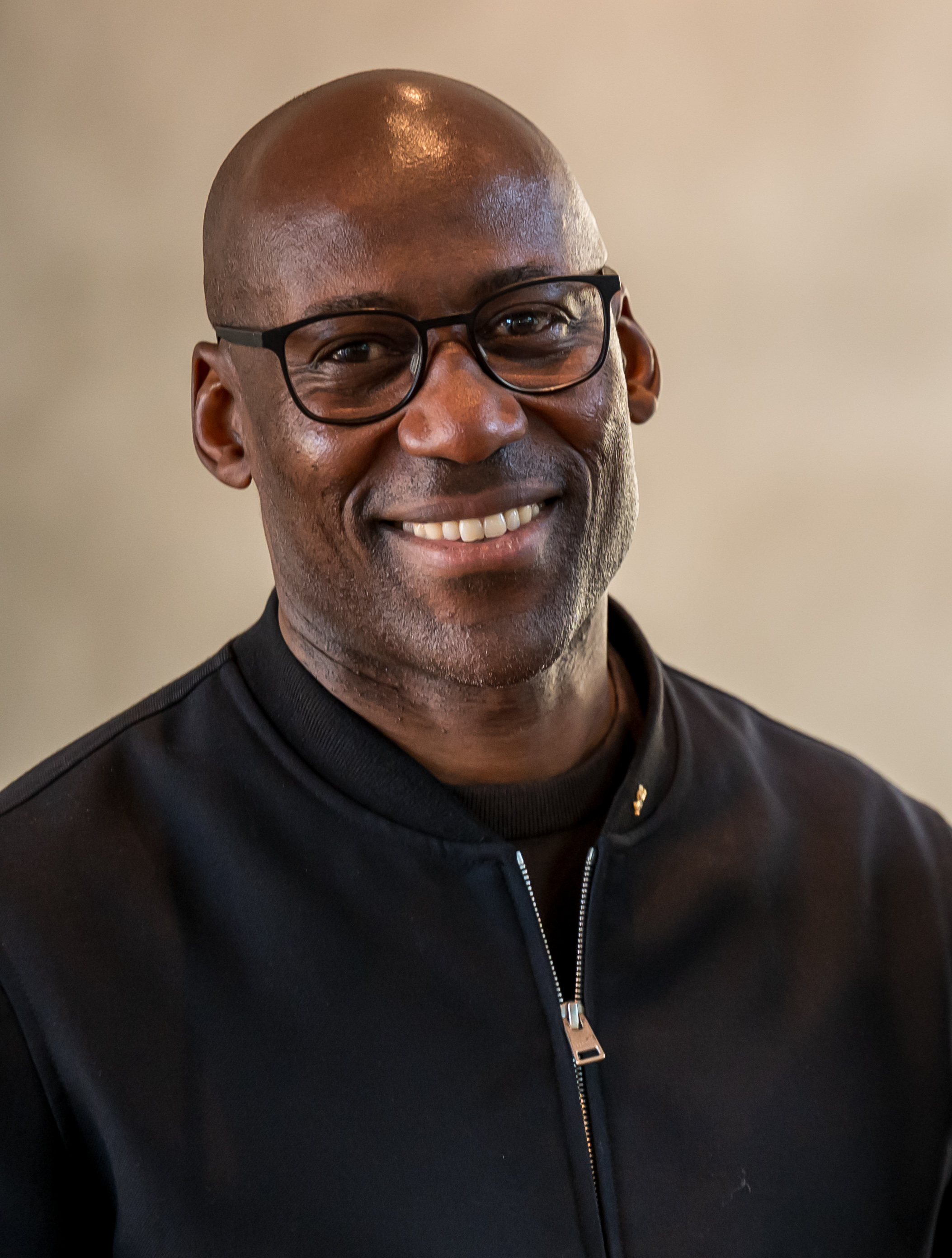
- Chialo in 2024

Senator for Culture and Social Cohesion
- In office 27 April 2023 – 29 April 2026
- Governing Mayor: Kai Wegner
- Preceded by: Klaus Lederer (as Senator for Culture and Europe)
- Succeeded by: Stefan Evers

Personal details
- Born: 18 July 1970 (age 56) Bonn, North Rhine-Westphalia, West Germany
- Party: CDU (since 2016)
- Other political affiliations: Alliance 90/The Greens (1990s)
- Education: University of Erlangen–Nuremberg (dropped out)
- Occupation: Singer • Politician

Joseph "Joe" Chialo (born 18 July 1970) is a German music manager, politician (CDU) and singer who has been serving as State Minister (Senator) for Culture and Social Cohesion in the government of Governing Mayor of Berlin Kai Wegner since 2023. On 2 May 2025, Chialo announced his resignation as State Minister, citing the far-reaching cuts in the cultural sector in Berlin as the reason.

== Early life and career ==
Chialo was born in Bonn, Germany, to a Tanzanian diplomatic family. His father hails from Nachingwea, in the southern part of Tanzania, and his ancestors fought alongside the Germans during the Maji Maji Rebellion in colonial German East Africa. His mother came to Germany in 1966 on a scholarship to train as a nurse. Chialo's first language was Swahili, but he later became fluent in German, which became his primary language. Before dropping out, Chialo attended the Friedrich-Alexander University in Erlangen, where he studied history, economics, and political science.

Chialo started his singing career with Blue Manner Haze after receiving a record deal with Sony Music.

== Political career ==
In the 1990s, Chialo was a member of The Greens – exclusively because he was a political admirer of Joschka Fischer. While Chialo supported the German government sending Bundeswehr missions in the Balkans, the Green party base did not, prompting Chialo to leave the party. Chialo joined the CDU in 2016 because of his Christian upbringing and values, he said.

Ahead of the 2021 elections, CDU chairman Armin Laschet included Chialo in his eight-member shadow cabinet for the Christian Democrats' campaign. He also ran to represent the party in the election in the Berlin-Spandau – Charlottenburg North constituency. However, he only garnered 23.5% of votes to the 32.8% received by SPD candidate Helmut Kleebank, and therefore lost the election.

In early 2022, Chialo was elected to the national leadership of the CDU.

== Personal life ==
Chialo is married and has one daughter. He is a Roman Catholic. He attended the Catholic boarding school at the Marienhausen Monastery in Rüdesheim-Aulhausen on the Rhine. In response to a wave of abuse scandals that rocked the German Catholic Church in 2011, Chialo founded an explicitly Catholic band that was to be a positive counterpoint to bad headlines. Explaining his decision, Chialo stated: "Because I owe a lot to the Catholic Church and because the Church is so much more than these incidents of abuse."
