= Global Labour University =

International university network

- Motto: Learning and Acting Together
- Type: Network
- Established: 2003; 23 years ago
- Website: http://www.global-labour-university.org/

The Global Labour University (GLU) is an international network of universities, trade unions, NGOs and the International Labour Organisation. It was initiated in 2002 and offers master's programs, academic certificate programs and massive open online courses (MOOC) on sustainable development, social justice, international labour standards and trade/labour unions, economic policies and global institutions.

Universities and workers’ organisations from around the world have jointly developed these unique global programmes. The programmes aim at allowing labour organisations and social movements to engage more effectively in social dialogue, public debate and policy implementation.

== Project concept ==
The GLU is a network of trade unionists, researchers and ILO (International Labour Organisation) experts who have combined their experience and knowledge to further academic expertise relative to the global labour market. This network develops and delivers high-level academic programmes, usually one year masters courses. It is a new approach to strengthening the intellectual and strategic capacity of workers’ organisations and to establish much stronger working relationships between trade/labour unions, the ILO, and the scientific community.

The GLU contributes to strengthening union capacity and competence to defend workers' interests, to promote the "Decent Work" agenda and to enable workers’ organisations to engage more effectively in social dialogue on social and economic policy issues such as employment, social protection and the implementation of international labour standards.

The programs support unions in upgrading their intellectual profile by building a channel for the development of qualified trade union leaders, as well as supporting the recruitment of younger experts. The courses in all countries are conducted in English.

As part of their course, students analyse and discuss, in a multidisciplinary fashion, the challenges of globalisation from a labour and trade/labour union perspective. The programmes offer a multicultural and multiregional environment: students and lecturers come from developing, transition and industrialised countries. Participants may also study one term of the programme in South Africa or Brazil and one term in Germany.

The curriculum of a pilot masters course was first developed in 2003/04, the first course starting in Germany in 2004/05, followed by courses in Africa (South Africa 2007) and Latin America (Brazil 2008), then in mid-2008, in Mumbai, India. Recently, the Penn State University, USA and the Jawaharlal Nehru University in New Delhi joined the network. Discussions have been held with a number of other universities in other countries. Whenever possible, students from all regions will be represented in the courses.

== Governance structure ==
The governance structure of the Global Labour University network is based on the partnership between the ILO, the national and international trade union movement, the partner universities and the funding bodies. A steering committee is heading the overall direction.

The Global Labour University is supported by the International Labour Organisation. A limited number of scholarships are available, usually for students from developing countries. The endorsement by a trade union is a requirement for a scholarship. The scholarship is conditional on a contribution of 1500 euros from the student, her/his supporting trade union or another donor.

== Participating partner institutions ==
=== Universities ===
- Universidade Estadual de Campinas, Brazil
- University of Kassel, Germany
- Berlin School of Economics and Law, Germany
- Tata Institute of Social Sciences, India
- Jawaharlal Nehru University, India
- University of the Witwatersrand, South Africa
- Pennsylvania State University, United States

=== Research institutes ===
- Centre for Informal Sector and Labour Studies (CISLS)in New Delhi, India
- Corporate Strategy and Industrial Development (CSID) in Johannesburg, South Africa
- European Trade Union Institute (ETUI) in Bruxelles, Belgium
- Friedrich-Ebert-Stiftung (FES) in Berlin, Germany
- Hans-Böckler-Stiftung (HBS) in Düsseldorf, Germany
- International Centre for Development and Decent work (ICDD) in Kassel, Germany
- National Labour and Economic Development Institute (NALEDI) in Johannesburg, South Afrika

=== Global union federations ===
- Building and Wood Workers' International (BWI)
- Education International (EI-IE)
- IndustriALL Global Union
- International Trade Union Confederation (ITUC)
- Public Services International (PSI)
- UNI Global Union

=== National trade union centres ===
- All India Trade Union Congress (AITUC), India
- American Federation of Labor - Congress of Industrial Organizations (AFL-CIO)
- Central Única dos Trabalhadores (CUT), Brazil
- Congress of South African Trade Unions (COSATU), South Africa
- Deutscher Gewerkschaftsbund (DGB), Germany
- Indian National Trade Union Congress (INTUC), India
- Self Employed Women’s Association (SEWA), India

=== International and non-governmental organisations ===
- Bureau for Workers' Activities (ACTRAV) at the International Labour Organisation
- International Institute for Labour Studies (IILS) at the International Labour Organisation
- Trade Union Advisory Committee to the OECD (TUAC)
- International Federation of Workers' Education Associations (IFWEA)
- Global Unions

=== Development cooperation agencies ===
- Deutsche Gesellschaft für Internationale Zusammenarbeit

=== Other cooperating units ===
- Research Committee on Labour Movements (RC44) of the International Sociological Association
- The International Labour and Trade Union Studies programme at Ruskin College Oxford, UK

== Master programmes ==
- "Labour Policies and Globalisation", Master of Arts (MA) at the University of Kassel and the Berlin School of Economics and Law in Germany (started in 2004)
- "Labour and Development, Economic Policy, Globalisation and Labour", Master at the University of the Witwatersrand in Johannesburg, South Africa (started in 2007)
- "Social Economy and Labour", Master at the State University of Campinas in São Paulo, Brazil (started in 2008)
- "Labor and Global Workers’ Rights", Master in Professional Studies (MPS) at the Penn State University, USA (started in 2014)
- "Development and Labour Studies", Master at the Jawaharlal Nehru University in New Delhi, India (starting 2015)

A first cooperation between Kassel and Witwatersrand allow for binational double degrees. More universities from Argentina, the United Kingdom, Portugal, Ghana, Russia, the Philippines and Turkey have expressed their interest in joining or are already participating.

== Annual conferences ==
The GLU holds an annual conference

- 2019 - XIV. GLU Conference "Reflecting 100 years of ILO – Shaping the rules for a new century of labour?" in Berlin, Germany
- 2018 - XIII. GLU Conference "The Future of Work: Democracy, Development and the Role of Labour" in Brazil
- 2017 - XII. GLU Conference "Reincarnation or Death of Neoliberalism? The rise of market authoritarianism and its challenges for labour" at JNU in New Delhi, India
- 2016 - XI. GLU Conference "The Just Transition and the Role of Labour: Our Ecological, Social, and Economic Future" in Johannesburg, S.A.
- 2015 - X. GLU Conference "Sharing the Gains: Containing Corporate Power" at the AFL-CIO headquarters, Washington D.C./USA
- 2014 - IX. GLU Conference "Inequality within and among Nations: Causes, Effects, and Responses" in Berlin, Germany
- 2012 - VIII. GLU Conference "Sustainable growth, development and labour: progressive responses at local, national and global level", in Campinas, Brazil
- 2011 - VII. GLU Conference "The Politics of Labour and Development", Johannesburg, S.A.
- 2010 - VI. GLU Conference "Labour and the Global Crisis: sharing the burden, shaping the future", Berlin, Germany
- 2009 - V. GLU Conference "Financialization of Capital, Deterioration of Working conditions", at TISS, Mumbai, India
- 2008 - IV. GLU Conference "Global development: challenges for union strategies", at UNICAMP, Campinas, Brazil
- 2007 - III. GLU Conference "Labour and the Challenges of Development", at WITS, Johannesburg, S.A.
- 2006 - II. GLU Conference "Global Challenges for Labour", in Berlin, Germany
- 2005 - I. GLU Conference "The effects of globalisation on national economic policies and trade union strategies" in Kassel, Germany

== Alumni network ==
The GLU promotes research cooperation and organizes summer schools and workshops in the alumni network. As of March 2019 the GLU counts 615 alumni.

== Training programme ENGAGE ==
The GLU offers in cooperation with University of the Witwatersrand a two-month training and research programme for trade unionists.

== Research projects ==
The first network-wide coordinated international research project was started in 2013 under the title "Combating Inequality: Causes of economic and social inequality". First results have been published in a special edition of the International Journal of Labour Research and in the GLU Working Paper series.

== Publications ==
From the GLU network two lines of publications have emerged:

- the Global Labour University Working Paper Series
- the Global Labour Column, a multilingual opinion-piece blog with eminent contributors among which recently the former Brazilian president Lula and the president of the ITUC João Antônio Felício

Compilations of these columns are regularly published as books, firstly via the ILO itself, and since 2015 with Pluto Press. Some of these have been translated to French and Spanish.

- Don't waste the crisis: Critical perspectives for a new economic model (2010), by Nicolas Pons-Vignon, International Labour Organisation, Geneva.
- There is an alternative: Economic policies and labour strategies beyond the mainstream (2011), by Nicolas Pons-Vignon, International Labour Organisation, Geneva.
- Confronting Finance Mobilizing the 99% for economic and social progress (2012), by Nicolas Pons-Vignon and Phumzile Ncube, International Labour Organisation, Geneva.
- Struggle in a Time of Crisis (2015), edited by Nicolas Pons-Vignon and Mbuso Nkosi, Pluto Press, London.

The Global Labour Journal, the official journal of the International Sociological Association's Research Committee on Labour Movements (RC44), is co-hosted by the GLU.

Although they are not officially part of the GLU, some scientific journals are closely linked to it via the persons represented in the editorial committees and the authors of the contributions. Amongst them are:

- International Journal of Labour Research, trilingual (English, French and Spanish), edited by the ACTRAV (formerly known as Labour Education)
- Labour, Capital and Society, bilingual (English and French)

== E-Learning programme ==
The GLU launched in June 2015 its first Massive Open Online Course (MOOC) on "Workers' Rights in a Global Economy" on the platform iversity.

== Persons linked to the GLU ==
- Jayati Ghosh
- Christoph Scherrer
