= Thorsten Faas =

German political scientist (born 1975)

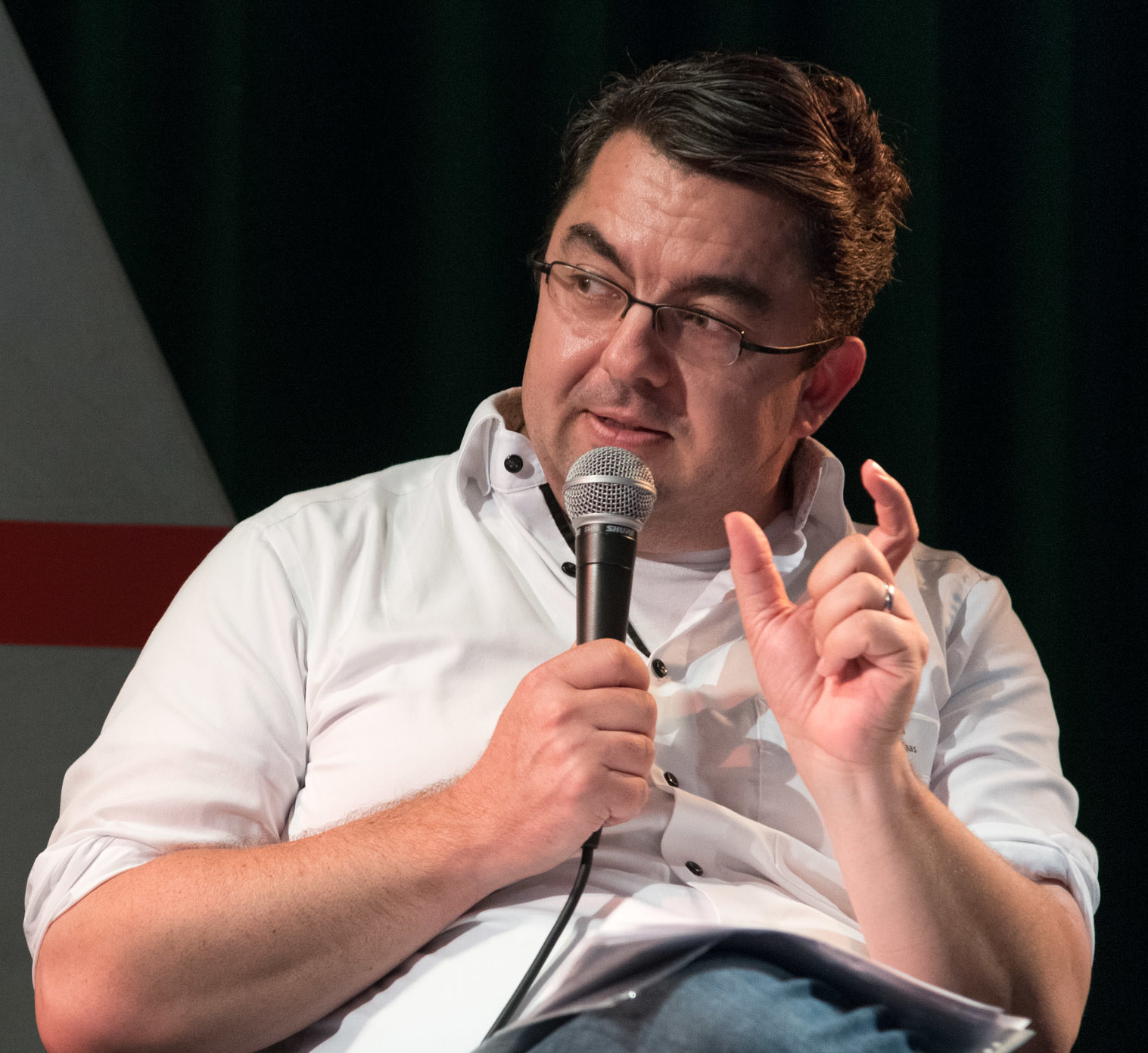
Thorsten Faas

Thorsten Faas (born 17 August 1975 in Idar-Oberstein) is a German political scientist. He is a professor of political sociology at the Otto Suhr Institute of Freie Universität Berlin.

== Education ==
After obtaining his Abitur in 1995 in Kirn, Thorsten Faas studied political science at the University of Bamberg and the London School of Economics and Political Science (LSE). He completed his studies at LSE in 2001 with a Master of Science.

== Career ==
From 2001 to 2003, he worked as a research fellow at the University of Bamberg, from 2003 to 2008, at the University of Duisburg-Essen and from 2008 to 2009 at the University of Mannheim. He earned his doctorate in 2008. His thesis was "Unemployment and voter behavior. Direct and indirect effects on voter turnout and party preferences in East and West Germany" under Rüdiger Schmitt-Beck at the University of Duisburg-Essen. The thesis was awarded the German Political Science Association's prize for the best dissertation in 2011. From 2009 to 2012, Faas was a junior professor of political science, in particular voter behavior, at the University of Mannheim. From September 2012 to September 2017, he was a university professor in the field of "Empirical Political Research" at the Institute of Political Science at the University of Mainz. On October 1, 2017, he became a university professor in the Department of Political Sociology of the Federal Republic of Germany at the Otto Suhr Institute for Political Science at Freie Universität Berlin. His research focuses on elections, electoral law, election campaigns and election studies. In the academic year 2025/2026, he held the DAAD-funded Hannah Arendt Visiting Professorship for German and European Studies at the Centre for European and Eurasian Studies (CEES) at the Munk School of Global Affairs and Public Policy at the University of Toronto.

From 2019 to 2025, he has been co-host of the political podcast Unter 3 on public television channel Phoenix together with Phoenix correspondent Erhard Scherfer. He regularly appears in German media outlets as an expert on elections and electoral campaigns.

== Other activities ==
From 2021 to 2024 he was a member of the board of the German Political Science Association. He currently serves as an executive committee member of the German Society for Electoral Studies.
