= Thomas Risse =

Thomas Risse (formerly Risse-Kappen) is a Berlin-based international relations scholar. He currently acts as chair of the Center for Transnational Relations, Foreign and Security Policy at the Otto Suhr Institute for Political Science of Freie Universität Berlin. Furthermore, he has several engagements in German and international research networks, and heads the PhD program of the Hertie School of Governance in Berlin.

== Education ==
Born in 1955, he received his PhD from the University of Frankfurt in 1987. From 1997 to 2001, he was joint chair of international relations at the European University Institute's Robert Schuman Centre for Advanced Studies and the Department of Social and Political Sciences in Florence, Italy.

== Work ==
Risse is usually identified as a constructivist scholar of international relations. In contrast to American constructivists, his work borrows heavily from German social theory and philosophy, and in particular the work of Jürgen Habermas. His work suggests that communicative action can reshape actors' understanding of their interests with important consequences for world politics.

During the 1980s the main focus of his work laid on security policy, his dissertation “Die Krise der Sicherheitspolitik” (The Crisis of Security Policy) dealt with foreign and security policy decision-making processes in West Germany. In his thesis he observes the development of a peace movement (opposed to the installation of medium-range rocket on German soil) and theorised their influence on West-German foreign policy. The contribution of his work is crucial to IR theory because it opposes the logic of equality between force and deterrence.

With the end of the Cold War, the focus of his work shifted to transnational relations and human rights. One of his works from this period is the edited volume “Bringing Transnational Relations Back In”. Here he argues that regular interactions between non-state actors, that do not act on behalf of national governments, but try to influence the policies of a state, got out of focus. These organisations could be various NGOs for example, the Socialist International, Amnesty International or religious groups among others. In this volume an outlook on methodology and theory of transnational relations and their impact on domestic policy is developed. Another work of reference of this period is “Die Macht der Menschenrechte” (The Power of Human Rights). Based on liberal theory and democratic peace, Risse looks at international norms, speech acts and political change in the South. Whereby the main focus is laid on the realisation of human rights. His core theory is that the key for respect of human rights is the influence on transnational and domestic civil society on state structures. Inter alia he shows that economic development and democratisation do not forcibly go hand in hand.

Post 9/11 his focus changed again towards research on failed states and governance. In his latest publication he focussed on aspects of governance in areas of limited statehood – distinct from failed states.

== Other activities ==
- Fritz Thyssen Foundation, member of the scientific advisory board
- Peace Research Institute Frankfurt (HSFK), member of the board of trustees
- Berlin Social Science Center (WZB), member of the advisory board
- German Council on Foreign Relations (DGAP), member of the steering committee
- Institute for European Politics (IEP), member of the academic advisory board
- Cohesify, member of the advisory board
- Science Europe, co-chair of the social sciences committee

== Recognition ==
- 2003 – Max Planck Research Prize for International Cooperation

== Personal life ==
Thomas Risse is married to Tanja Börzel.
