= Jürgen W. Falter =

German political scientist

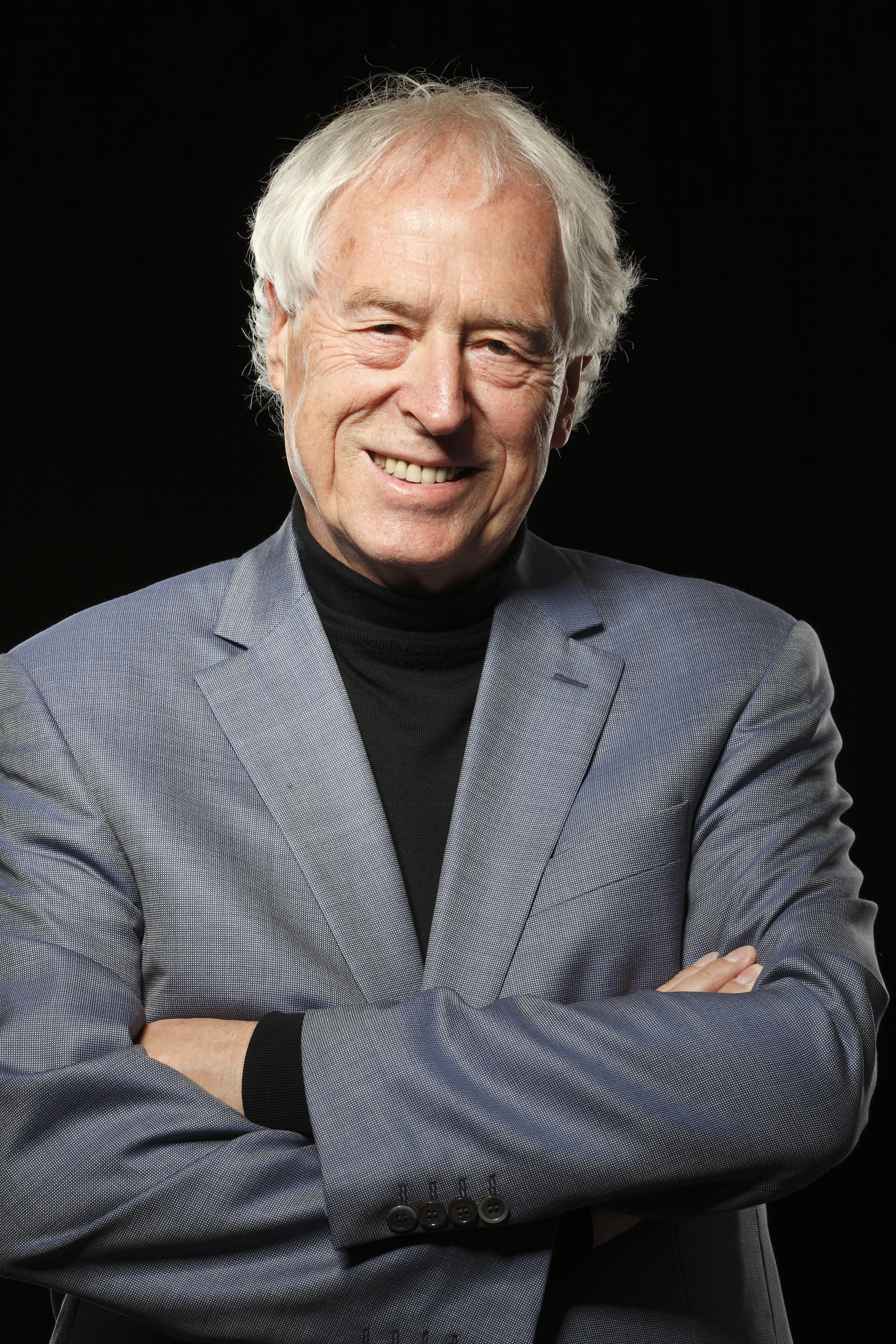
- Falter in 2017
- Born: 22 January 1944 (age 82); Heppenheim, Hesse, Germany
- Education: Saarland University; Free University of Berlin (Diplom, 1968)
- Scientific career
- Fields: Political science
- Workplaces: University of Mainz
- Doctoral advisor: Karl Kaiser, Gerald L. Eberlein
- Doctoral students: Kristina Schröder

Jürgen Wilfried Falter (born 22 January 1944) is a German political scientist. His research interests include political extremism and xenophobia.

Born in Heppenheim, Hesse, Falter enrolled with a political science and modern history major at the University of Heidelberg in 1963 before finishing his studies with a Diplom at the Free University of Berlin in 1968. He earned his doctoral degree in 1973 and his Habilitation in 1981, both from the Saarland University.

In 1983 he accepted a chair at the Otto-Suhr-Institut in Berlin, a position he held until 1992. In 1993 he joined faculty at the University of Mainz.

== Selected publications ==
- ——— (1978), "Some Theoretical and Methodological Problems of Multilevel Analysis Reconsidered", Social Science Information, 17 (6): 841–869, doi:10.1177/053901847801700604, S2CID 144227423.
- ——— Rattinger, Hans (1984), "Normal Vote Analysis. A Methodological Note", European Journal of Political Research, 12 (3): 277–288, doi:10.1111/j.1475-6765.1984.tb00089.x
- ——— Schumann, Siegfried (1988), "Affinity towards right-wing extremism in Western Europe", West European Politics, 11 (2): 96–110, doi:10.1080/01402388808424684.
- ——— (1990), "The Two Hindenburg Elections of 1925 and 1932: A Total Reversal of Voter Coalitions", Central European History, 23 (2/3): 225–241, doi:10.1017/s0008938900021361, JSTOR 4546175, S2CID 145648611.
- ——— (1992), "Economic Debts and Political Gains: Electoral Support for the NSDAP in Agrarian and Commercial Sectors, 1928-1933", Historical Social Research, 17 (1): 3–21.
- ——— Brustein, William (1995), "Who Joined the Nazi Party? Assessing Theories of the Social Origins of Nazism", Zeitgeschichte, 22 (3/4): 83–108.
- ——— Klein, Markus (1996), "The Mass Basis of the Extreme Right in Europe in a Comparative Perspective", Research on Democracy and Society, 3: 41–61.
