= Heinrich Lummer =

German politician (1932–2019)

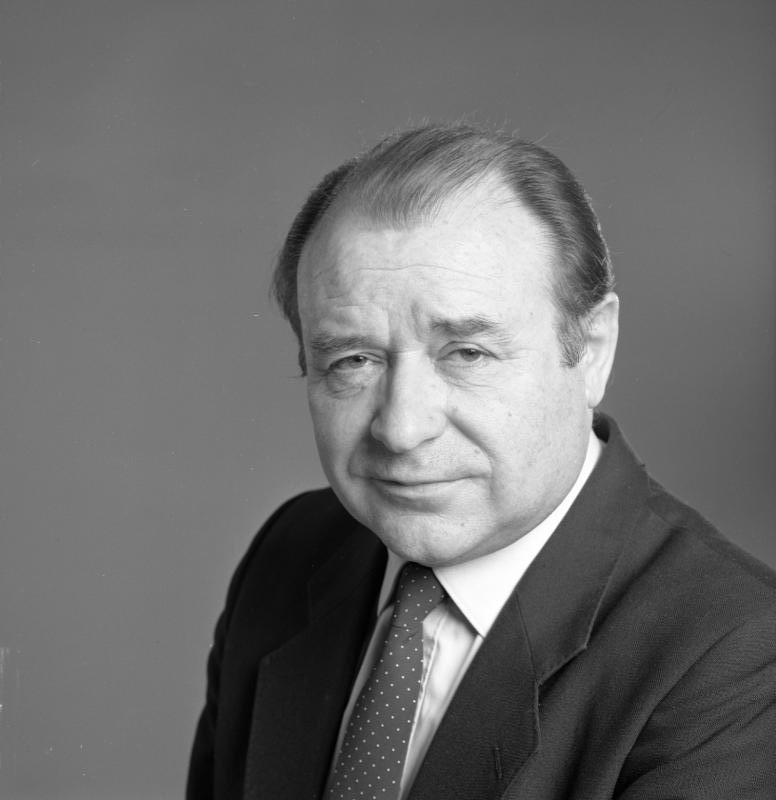
- Lummer in 1989

Member of the Bundestag; from Berlin
- In office 18 February 1987 – 26 October 1998
- Constituency: West Berlin (1987–1990); State list (1990–1994); Berlin-Spandau (1994–1998)

Senator of the Interior and Sports of Berlin
- In office 11 June 1981 – 17 April 1986
- Governing Mayor: Richard von Weizsäcker; Eberhard Diepgen
- Preceded by: Frank Dahrendorf
- Succeeded by: Wilhelm Kewenig

President of the Berlin House of Representatives
- In office 10 December 1980 – 11 June 1981
- Preceded by: Peter Lorenz
- Succeeded by: Peter Rebsch

Member of the; Berlin House of Representatives
- In office March 1967 – 30 June 1987
- Preceded by: Multi-member district
- Succeeded by: Friedrich-Wilhelm Krahe
- Constituency: State list (1967–1975); Zehlendorf 2 (1975–1987)

Personal details
- Born: 21 November 1932 Essen, Germany
- Died: 15 June 2019 (aged 86) Berlin, Germany
- Resting place: Waldfriedhof Zehlendorf
- Party: Christian Democratic Union
- Children: 3
- Education: Free University of Berlin
- Occupation: Politician and lawyer

Heinrich Lummer (21 November 1932 – 15 June 2019) was a German politician and member of the Christian Democratic Union (CDU).

== Life ==
At the Free University of Berlin, Lummer studied German law and philosophy. He became a member of the German political party Christian Democratic Union. From 1967 to 1987, he was a member of the Abgeordnetenhaus of Berlin. From 1981 to 1986, Lummer was the senator for the Interior and Sports in Berlin. From 1987 to 1998 he was a member of the Bundestag. He was considered to be a conservative hardliner, an exponent of the right wing of his party, oftentimes even as part of the fringe right. Especially later in his life, he subscribed to several far-right conspiracy theories, such as the idea that immigration into Germany was part of a grand plan to destroy the German nation. Lummer was married, had three children and lived in Steglitz-Zehlendorf.

== Works by Lummer ==
- Standpunkte eines Konservativen. Sinus Verlag, 1987.
- Asyl. Ullstein-Report, 1992.
