= Gollaleh Ahmadi =

German politician (born 1982)

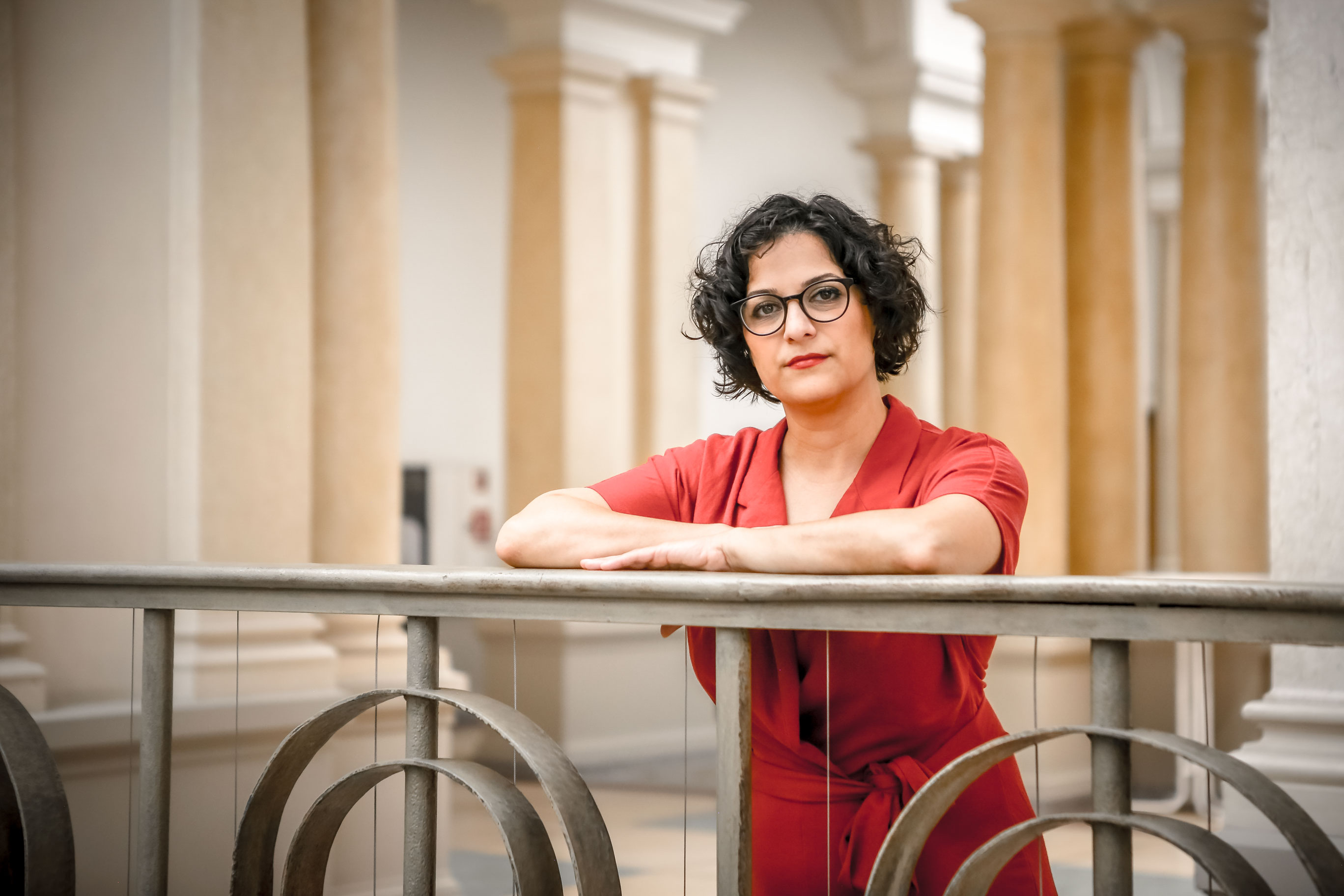
- Ahmadi in 2021

Member of the Abgeordnetenhaus of Berlin
- Incumbent
- Assumed office 4 November 2021

Personal details
- Born: Gollaleh Ahmadi; 1982 (age 43–44) Tehran, Iran
- Party: Alliance 90/The Greens

Gollaleh Ahmadi (born 1982) is a German politician of Alliance 90/The Greens who is serving as a member of the Abgeordnetenhaus of Berlin since 2021.

== Life, education and career ==
Ahmadi was born in Tehran in 1982. Her mother was a journalist and her father a car mechanic and trade union official. Her parents experienced political persecution because they were members of the pro-Soviet Tudeh Party of Iran; at times they were imprisoned or had to live undercover. The family fled to Germany in 1996, where they lived in a refugee shelter for three and a half years before settling in Fürstenwalde. Gollaleh completed her school education and passed the Abitur there in 2004. She then studied political science and the history and culture of the Middle East in Magdeburg, Frankfurt an der Oder, and Berlin.

From 2009 to 2013, Ahmadi was spokeswoman for a German-Iranian student group campaigning for democracy and human rights in Iran. As part of an education campaign in Berlin, she led workshops on democratic education, anti-discrimination, anti-feminism and anti-racism.

Between 2017 and 2019, Ahmadi worked in parliamentary offices of the Bundestag and the Abgeordnetenhaus of Berlin as a research assistant. She was also an interpreter at the department for justice in the Senate of Berlin. In 2019, she became officer manager for of a member of the Abgeordnetenhaus.

== Politics ==
Ahmadi joined the Greens in 2013 and became involved in local politics in Berlin. In the 2016 Berlin state election, she ran in the Spandau 2 constituency but was not elected. In the local elections held on the same day, she was elected to the Spandau district council, where she became chair of the Greens parliamentary group. During the course of her political career, Ahmadi has experienced hostility and abuse, including threats of violence.

Ahmadi is also a delegate in the Green Federal Women's Council since 2019, was a member of the state steering group on education in 2017–2018, and co-speaker for the state working group "Women* and Gender" in 2019.

Ahmadi was nominated as the Greens candidate for the Spandau 3 constituency in the 2021 Berlin state election, as well as ninth place on the state party list. She placed third with 13.5% of votes, and was elected to the Abgeordnetenhaus on the state list. Afterwards, she became Greens spokeswoman for security and media policy. In January 2022, she was elected chairwoman of the Committee for the Interior.
