= Klaus Schroeder =

German political scientist and historian (born 1949)

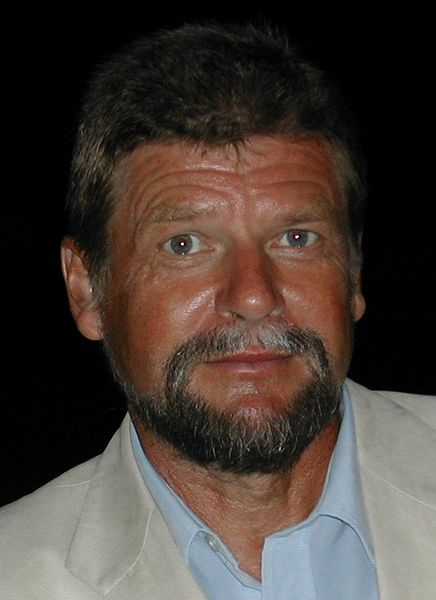
Schroeder in 2004

Klaus Schroeder (born 16 October 1949) is a German political scientist and historian. He teaches at the Free University of Berlin and the Otto Suhr Institute. He is prolific as an author and commentator on the history of the German Democratic Republic and on the enduring post-German reunification conflicts and tensions in Germany.

== Life ==
Klaus Schroeder was born in Travemünde, a ferry port and coastal resort adjacent to Lübeck. Schroeder grew up in a politically engaged family near the increasingly impermeable—and later heavily fortified—Inner German border. There were nevertheless school trips which enabled pupils to obtain a glimpse of life in East Germany.

He would later recall a school trip for which the class was accommodated at a hostel which was also hosting East German school children who were unable to tear themselves away from the television advertisements transmitted from across the border by West German television. Schroeder attended the prestigious Katharineum in Lübeck, passing the necessary exams in 1969.

Instead of attending a nearby university he now moved to West Berlin, "attracted by the political climate there", where he studied biology, applied economics, and political science at the Free University of Berlin (FUB). He emerged in 1975 with a first degree in political sciences.

He next accepted a bursary for a doctorate and, from the winter term of 1975/76, a teaching contract at the FUB. Between 1978 and 1982 Klaus Schroeder worked as a research assistant at the university Institute of Sociology. His focus was on government, organisation and planning. This provided the basis for an empirical study entitled "Der Weg in die Stagnation. Eine empirische Studie zu Konjunkturentwicklung und Konjunkturpolitik in der Bundesrepublik von 1967 bis 1982" This was accepted as a doctoral dissertation. In 1984, two years after it earned him his doctorate, Schroeder published it in West Germany.

Then, in 1994, he obtained his habilitation, a higher academic qualification which cleared the way for a life-time career in the universities sector. His work was again in the field of political sciences, and the award again came from the FUB. His publications and lectures dealt with themes in contemporary history along with the welfare state, extremist movements, processes of societal modernisation, social movements more generally, and with the social and political systems of West- and East Germany.

Between 1982 and 1987, Schroeder worked in the Presidium Office at the Free University, supporting its first vice-president, Johann Wilhelm Gerlach, and Gerlach's successor. Schroeder's responsibilities in this administrative role covered the interface between then University Presidency and the Political Sciences section. After undertaking a project leadership role, he took over the leadership of the Politics and Technology Department in 1995.

Meanwhile, in 1992 he teamed up with historian Manfred Görtemaker and sociologists Manfred Wilke and Siegward Lönnendonke to create the research group devoted to "the SED state," which has become a permanent high-level working and research group, mostly funded by third parties, devoted to Germany's post-1945 division and the reunification project on which the country was able to embark 45 years later. Since then Schroeder has headed up the research group under the auspices of the Free University.

In 2013, Cicero listed the 500 German intellectuals most frequently cited over the previous ten years. Klaus Schroeder was included in the list at position 254.
