= Christoph Scherrer =

German economist and political scientist (born 1956)

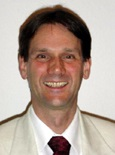
Christoph Scherrer

Christoph Scherrer (born 1956, Frankfurt am Main) is a German economist and political scientist. Currently, he is a professor of globalization and politics and Executive Director of the International Center for Development and Decent Work (ICDD) at the University of Kassel.

== Life ==
Christoph Scherrer studied economics and American studies at the University of Frankfurt, where he also received his PhD in political science in 1989. From 1990–1998, he was an assistant professor at the J.F. Kennedy-Institute of the Free University Berlin. During this time, he was a guest professor at Rutgers University in Newark, a visiting fellow in the Department of Political Science at Yale University, held a J.F. Kennedy-Memorial Fellowship at Harvard University and was a Hewlett Scholar at the John E. Andrus Center for Public Affairs at Wesleyan University, Middletown, CT.

After obtaining his habilitation in 1999, he became a visiting professor of European politics at the Berlin School of Economics and a visiting professor at the University of Kassel. Since 2000, he has been a full professor of "Globalization & Politics" at the University of Kassel. Since then he has also held posts as a visiting fellow at YCIAS-Yale University, visiting professor at the Universidad Autónoma de Yucatán, visiting scholar at the International Labour Organization, visiting professor at the Tata Institute of Social Sciences in Mumbai and senior fellow at the Center for Post-Growth Societies, University of Jena. Currently, Scherrer directs two English-language Master programs: MA Global Political Economy (GPE) and Labour Policies and Globalization (LPG). He is the Executive Director of the International Center for Development and Decent Work (ICDD), an awarded center of excellence in development cooperation, Co-Director of the Böckler/Böll funded PhD program "Global Social Policies and Governance" and a member of the Steering Committee of the Global Labour University. He is laureate of the "Excellence in Teaching" prize of the state of Hessen, 2007.

== Research ==
Scherrer's research interests lay in the field of international political economy, in particular the social dimensions of globalization. He contributed to the development of French Regulation Theory through an extensive study of the transition of the U.S. auto and steel industry to post-Fordism and through a post-structuralist inspired critique of its neglect of contingency in phases of stable capital accumulation. He introduced Gramscian insights to international political economy in Germany and coined the term 'double hegemony' for the interlaced linkage of the hegemony of the US-American national-state with the hegemony of an emerging international bourgeoisie. He directed numerous studies on the "Social Dimensions of International Trade" and "Trade in Services" funded by the Hans Böckler Stiftung (HBS), the Friedrich Ebert Foundation (FES), the German Foreign Office, the German Parliament, the European Parliament, and the Austrian Chancellery. His most recent work is co-directing an international research project on economic inequality.

== Books ==
- Scherrer, C., Garcia, A. and Wullweber, J. (2023) Handbook on Critical Political Economy and Public Policy, Elgar.
- Scherrer, C. (2021) Macht in weltweiten Lieferketten, Hamburg, VSA.
- Scherrer, C. (2021): America second? Die USA, China und der Weltmarkt, Berlin, Bertz + Fischer Verlag.
- Karatepe and Scherrer (eds.) 2021: The Phantom of Upgrading in Agricultural Supply Chains: A Cross-Country, Cross-Crop Comparison of Smallholders, Nomos.
- Scherrer, C. and Santosh, V.(2018). Decent Work Deficits in Southern Agriculture: Measurements, Drivers and Strategies. Augsburg: Rainer Hampp Verlag.
- Scherrer，C.(2017). Public Banks in the Age of Financialization: A Comparative Perspective. Cheltenham: Edward Elgar.ISBN 9781786430656
- Scherrer, C. (2017). Enforcement Instruments for Social Human Rights along Supply Chains. Augsburg: Rainer Hampp Verlag.
- Christoph Scherrer, Katja Radon, Andreas Haarstrick, Lars Ribbe, Reiner Doluschitz(Hrsg.) 2016: Forced Migration - environmental and socioeconomic dimensions. Perspectives of higher education institutions in development cooperation: 19 - 20 Oktober 2016, Berlin, Germany: 1st Exceed Conference Summary. München: Exceed Conference.
- Ulrich Brand, Helen Schwenken, Joscha Wullweber (eds.): Globalisierung analysieren, kritisieren und verändern: Das Projekt Kritische Wissenschaft. Festschrift for Christoph Scherrer, VSA 2016, ISBN 978-3-89965-724-1
- with Alexander Gallas, Hansjörg Herr and Frank Hoffer (eds.): Combating Inequality. The Global North and South. Routledge, 2015, ISBN 978-1-138-91685-2 (Look inside)
- Scherrer (ed.) 2014: T he Transatlantic Trade and Investment Partnership: Implications for Labor, Mering, Rainer Hampp Verlag.
- with Bob Jessop, Brigitte Young (eds.), 2014: Financial Cultures and Crisis Dynamics, Oxford, Routledge.
- with Debdulal Saha (eds.), 2013: Food Crisis: Implications for Labour, Mering, Rainer Hampp Verlag.
- with Andreas Hänlein (Hrsg.), Sozialkapitel in Handelsabkommen - Begründungen und Vorschläge aus juristischer, ökonomischer und politischer Sicht, Integration Europas und Ordnung der Weltwirtschaft, Bd. 38. Nomos-Verlag, 2012
- Scherrer, C. (Ed.). (2011). China's Labor Question. München: Rainer Hampp Verlag. http://www.global-labour-university.org/fileadmin/books/CLQ_full_book.pdf
- with Caren Kunze, Globalisierung, Göttingen, UTB / Vandenhoeck & Ruprecht, 2011
- mit Thomas Dürmeier und Bernd Overwien (Hrsg.), Perspektiven auf die Finanzkrise, Leverkuse,. Verlag Barbara Budrich, 2010
- with Brigitte Young (Hrsg.), The Role of Gender Knowledge in Policy Networks, Baden-Baden, Nomos, 2010
- with Ute Clement, Jörg Nowak und Sabine Ruß (Hrsg.), Public Governance und schwache Interessen, Wiesbaden, VS Verlag, 2010
- Globalisierung wider Willen? Die Durchsetzung liberaler Außenwirtschaftspolitik in den USA, Berlin, Ed. Sigma, 1999
- Im Bann des Fordismus. Die Auto- und Stahlindustrie der USA im internationalen Konkurrenzkampf., Berlin, Ed. Sigma/Rainer Bohn Verlag, 1992
