= Philipp Genschel =

German political scientist

Philipp Genschel is a German political scientist. He currently holds the Joint Chair in European Public Policy at the Robert Schuman Centre for Advanced Studies and the Department of Political and Social Sciences of the European University Institute in Florence, Italy. Before joining the EUI, he was a professor of political science at Jacobs University Bremen, Germany, and a research associate at the Max-Planck-Institute for the Study of Societies in Cologne, Germany.

== Research interest ==
Philipp Genschel’s work revolves around three broad topics: taxation, European integration and governance theory.

His early research focused on the international political economy of taxation. He asked why taxation is so relatively resilient to international cooperation, analyzed the logic of international tax competition, and reconstructed the evolution of the European and the global tax regime. Jointly with Laura Seelkopf, he has recently compiled a ‘Tax Introduction Dataset’ that lists the date of the first permanent introduction of six major taxes (including the personal income tax and the VAT) in 220 jurisdictions worldwide, 1750-2018.

In joint work with Markus Jachtenfuchs, Genschel has analyzed the European integration of ‘core state powers’, i.e. of the three key resources of sovereign government: money, coercive power and public administration. They show that the integration of these powers (for instance in EMU or Schengen) is associated with the institutional fragmentation, territorial differentiation and political segmentation of the EU: ‘more integration, less federation’. Purportedly, this outcome reflects specific features of core state powers including high political salience, and high propensity for zero-sum conflict.

Together with Kenneth W. Abbott, Duncan Snidal and Bernhard Zangl, Genschel has explored the agency of international organizations. More specifically, they analyzed how IOs ‘orchestrate’ the voluntary cooperation of NGOs, transgovernmental networks and other third parties to leverage their power and gain autonomy from their member state principals. Based on this work, they critically engage with principal-agent theory and compare orchestration to other modes of indirect governance including delegation, cooptation and trusteeship.

== Publications ==
- Philipp Genschel (2002): Steuerwettbewerb und Steuerharmonisierung in der Europäischen Union (Tax competition and tax harmonization in the EU). Frankfurt a.M.: Campus.
- Laura Seelkopf, Moritz Bubek, Edgars Eihmanis, … & Philipp Genschel (2019): The rise of modern taxation: A new comprehensive dataset of tax introductions worldwide.
- Philipp Genschel & Markus Jachtenfuchs (eds.) (2014): Beyond the Regulatory Polity? The European Integration of Core State Powers. Oxford: Oxford University Press.
- Philipp Genschel & Markus Jachtenfuchs (2016): More integration, less federation: The European integration of core state powers. In: Journal of European Public Policy 23(1), 42-59
- Kenneth W. Abbott, Philipp Genschel, Duncan Snidal & Bernhard Zangl (eds.) (2015): International Organizations as Orchestrators. Oxford University Press.
- Kenneth W. Abbott, Philipp Genschel, Duncan Snidal & Bernhard Zangl (2016): Two logics of indirect governance: Delegation and orchestration. In: British Journal of Political Science 46(4), 719-729
