= Helmut Kleebank =

German politician

Helmut Kleebank MdB
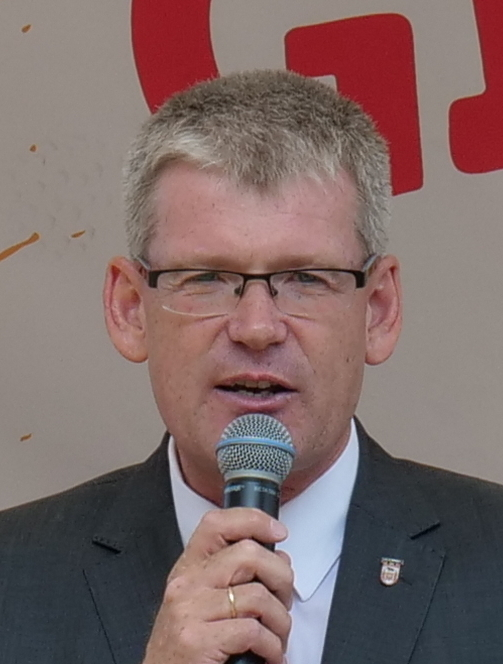
- Kleebank in 2018

Member of the Bundestag; for Berlin-Spandau – Charlottenburg North
- Incumbent
- Assumed office 26 October 2021
- Preceded by: Swen Schulz

Personal details
- Born: 18 November 1964 (age 61) West Berlin, West Germany
- Party: Social Democratic
- Children: 5
- Education: Free University of Berlin; TU Berlin
- Occupation: Teacher

Helmut Kleebank (born 18 November 1964) is a German teacher and politician of the Social Democratic Party (SPD) who has been serving as a member of the Bundestag since 2021.

== Political career ==
Kleebank served as mayor of Spandau from 2011 to 2021.

Kleebank was elected directly to the Bundestag in 2021, representing the Berlin-Spandau – Charlottenburg North district. In parliament, he has been serving on the Committee on Climate Action and Energy and the Committee on the Environment, Nature Conservation, Nuclear Safety and Consumer Protection. He has also been chairing the Parliamentary Advisory Board on Sustainable Development.

Within his parliamentary group, Kleebank belongs to the Parliamentary Left, a left-wing movement.

== Other activities ==
- Nuclear Waste Disposal Fund (KENFO), Member of the Board of Trustees (since 2022)
