= Elmar Altvater =

German Marxist academic (1938–2018)

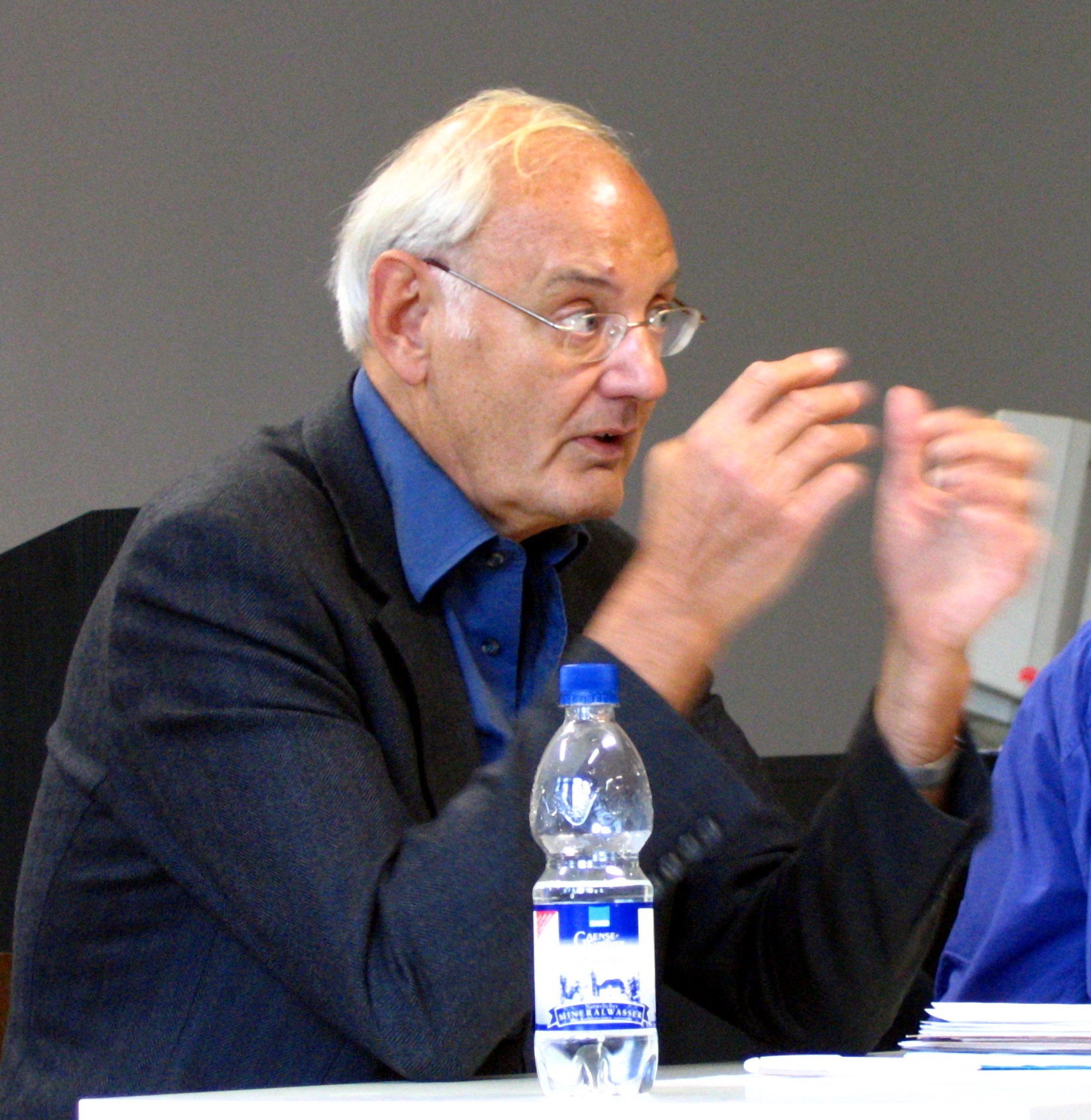
- Elmar Altvater in April 2005
- Born: August 24, 1938; Kamen, Province of Westphalia, Germany
- Died: May 1, 2018 (aged 79); Berlin, Germany
- Occupations: Economist, sociologist, political scientist, university teacher
- Employer: Otto-Suhr-Institut
- Political party: Alliance 90/The Greens; The Left

Elmar Altvater (24 August 1938 – 1 May 2018) was a German political scientist. He was professor of political science at the Otto-Suhr-Institut of the Free University of Berlin, before retiring on 30 September 2004. He continued to work at the institute, and published articles and books.

== Biography ==
As a student, Altvater studied economics and sociology in Munich, and attained a doctorate with a dissertation on "Environmental Problems in the Soviet Union". At the Otto-Suhr-Institut, he was active in socialist research groups, working with among others Klaus Busch, Wolfgang Schoeller and Frank Seelow, and he gained fame as one of Germany's most important Marxist philosophers, who strongly influenced the political and economic theory of the 1968 generation of radicals. His analysis, centered on the logic of capital accumulation crisis in state interventions is key to the Marxist theory of state-derivationism. Altvater argues that the state performs four general maintenance functions particular capitalists cannot undertake: providing an initial legal system with property and contract law, regulating the class struggle between workers and owners of capital, enforcing terms of international trade and market expansion through military presence, and providing infrastructure.

In 1970, he co-founded the German journal PROKLA - Journal for Critical Social Science of which he remained an editor. In 1971, he became university professor in political economy at the Otto-Suhr-Institut. Apart from questions of development theory, the debt crisis, and the regulation of markets, he remains preoccupied with the effects of capitalist economies on the environment.

Altvater was a noted critic of the political economy and author of numerous writings on globalization and critiques of capitalism. A standard work is his book The Limits of Globalization (1996), written with his companion Birgit Mahnkopf.

Altvater supported the German Greens for some time, but after the 1999 military intervention in Kosovo (which as a member of the governing coalition the party had to support) increasingly maintained a critical distance. He was a member of the Bundestag Commission of Inquiry The World Economy - Challenges and Answers (1999–2002). Altvater was a supporter of ATTAC (he was a member of its Scientific Advisory Board) and the World Social Forum.

Altvater has employed the term "Capitalocene", which is used by environmentalists as an alternative to the Anthropocene.

== Works ==
- 1969: Die Weltwährungskrise
- 1969: Gesellschaftliche Produktion und ökonomische Rationalität - Externe Effekte und zentrale Planung im Wirtschaftssystem des Sozialismus
- 1979: Vom Wirtschaftswunder zur Wirtschaftskrise, Berlin (West) (with Jürgen Hoffmann and Willi Semmler)
- 1983: Alternative Wirtschaftspolitik jenseits des Keynesianismus - Wirtschaftspolitische Optionen der Gewerkschaften in Westeuropa (with Kurt Hübner and Michael Stanger) ISBN 3-531-11620-7
- 1987: Sachzwang Weltmarkt. Verschuldungskrise, blockierte Industrialisierung, ökologische Gefährdung - der Fall Brasilien
- 1991: Die Zukunft des Marktes. Ein Essay über die Regulation von Geld und Natur nach dem Scheitern des "real existierenden Sozialismus". (translated into English as The Future of the Market: An Essay on the Regulation of Money and Nature after the Collapse of 'Actually Existing Socialism' (Verso). English ISBN 0-86091-610-3 ISBN 978-0860916109
- 1991: The Poverty of Nations: A Guide to the Debt Crisis-From Argentina to Zaire, by Kurt Hubner (Author), Jochen Lorentzen (Author), Elmar Altvater (Author, Editor), Raul Rojas (Editor), (St. Martin's Press) ISBN 0-86232-949-3
- 1992: Der Preis des Wohlstands oder Umweltplünderung und neue Welt(un)ordnung. Münster
- 1994: Tschernobyl und Sonnenbrand oder: Vom Sinn physikalischer Kategorien in den Sozialwissenschaften. Replik auf die Kritik von Wolfgang Hein, in: Peripherie, Nr. 54, S. 101–112
- 1996: (with Birgit Mahnkopf) Grenzen der Globalisierung. Ökonomie, Ökologie und Politik in der Weltgesellschaft. ISBN 3-929586-75-4
- 1999: "Restructuring the space of democracy: the effects of capitalist globalization and the ecological crisis on the form and substance of democracy" in Global Ethics and Environment, Editor Nicholas Low ISBN 0-415-19736-8
- 2002: (with Birgit Mahnkopf): Globalisierung der Unsicherheit – Arbeit im Schatten, schmutziges Geld und informelle Politik. ISBN 3-89691-513-4
- 2005: Das Ende des Kapitalismus, wie wir ihn kennen. Eine radikale Kapitalismuskritik. Münster: Westfälisches Dampfboot. ISBN 978-3-89691-627-3
- 2007 Elmar Altvater & Birgit Mahnkopf, Konkurrenz für das Empire. Die Zukunft der Europäischen Union in der globalisierten Welt. ISBN 978-3-89691-652-5
- 2008 Elmar Altvater & Achim Brunnengräber (eds.), Ablasshandel gegen Klimawandel? Marktbasierte Instrumente in der globalen Klimapolitik und ihre Alternativen. ISBN 978-3-89965-291-8
- 2010 Elmar Altvater, Der große Krach, oder die Jahrhundertkrise von Wirtschaft und Finanzen, von Politik und Natur. ISBN 978-3-89691-785-0
