= Swen Schulz =

German politician

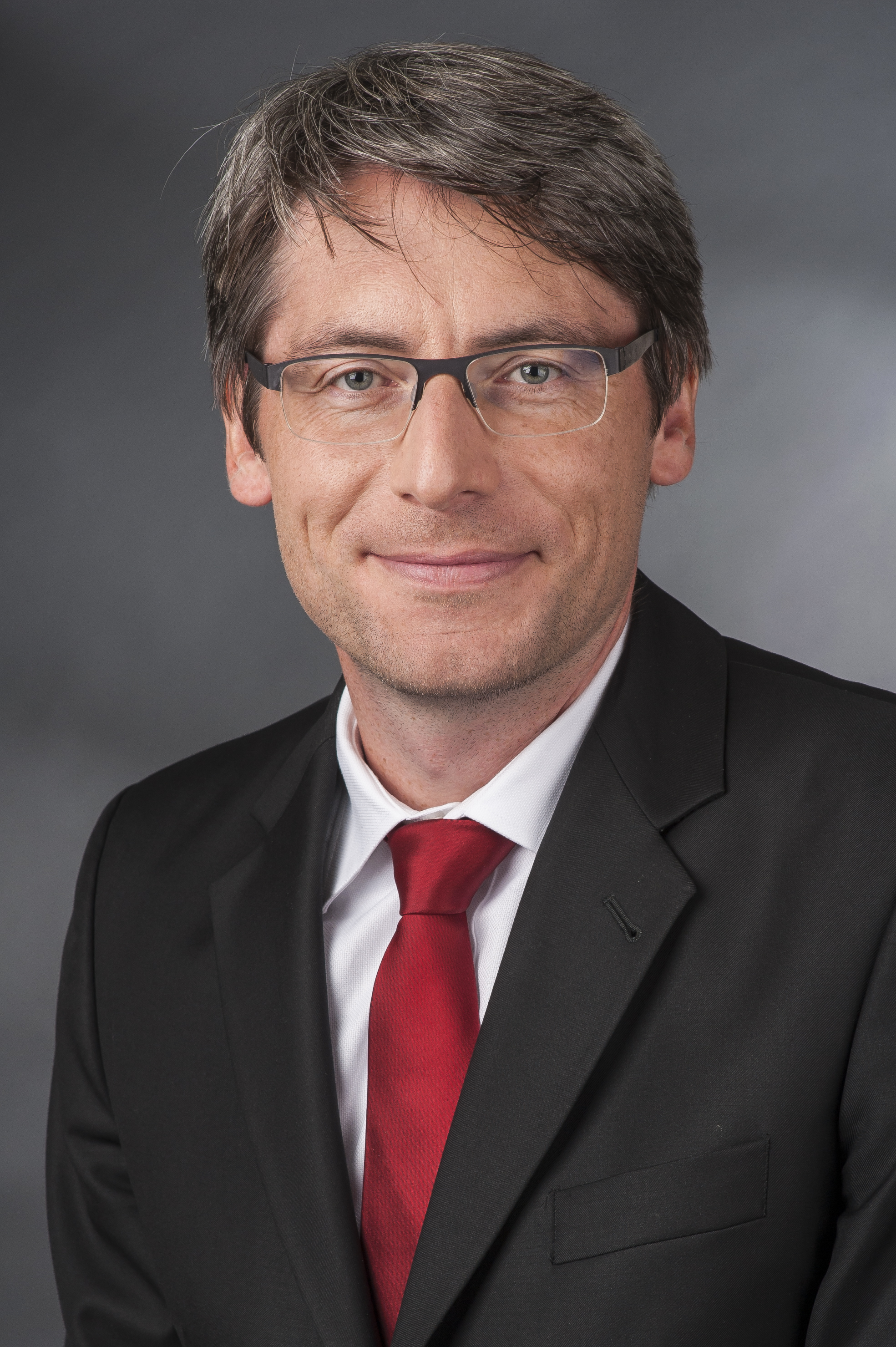
- Schulz in 2014

Member of the Bundestag; from Berlin
- In office 17 October 2002 – 26 October 2021
- Preceded by: Wolfgang Behrendt
- Succeeded by: Helmut Kleebank
- Constituency: See list: Berlin-Spandau – Charlottenburg North (2002–2009); State list (2009–2017); Berlin-Spandau – Charlottenburg North (2017–2021)

Personal details
- Born: 1 March 1968 (age 58) Hamburg, West Germany
- Party: Social Democratic
- Children: 3
- Education: Free University of Berlin

Swen Schulz (born 1 March 1968) is a German politician of the Social Democratic Party (SPD) who served as a member of the Bundestag from the state of Berlin from 2002 until 2021.

== Political career ==
Schulz became a member of the Bundestag after the 2002 German federal election. From 2002 until 2013, he served on the Committee for Education, Research and Technology Assessment.

In the negotiations to form a Grand Coalition of Chancellor Angela Merkel's Christian Democrats and the SPD following the 2013 federal elections, Schulz was part of the SPD delegation in the working group on education and research policy, led by Johanna Wanka and Doris Ahnen. From 2014 until 2021, he was a member of the Budget Committee. In this capacity, he served as his parliamentary group's rapporteur on the annual budget of the Federal Ministry of Education and Research.

In 2018, Schulz announced that he would not stand in the 2021 federal elections but instead resign from active politics by the end of the parliamentary term.

== Other activities ==
- Leibniz Association, Member of the Senate (since 2021)
- Association of German Foundations, Member of the Parliamentary Advisory Board
- Berlin Social Science Center (WZB), Member of the Board of Trustees
- Ernst Reuter Foundation for Advanced Study, Member of the Board of Trustees
- University of Hagen, Member of the Parliamentary Advisory Board
- Gegen Vergessen – Für Demokratie, Member
- Humanist Association of Germany (HVD), Member
