= Willi Semmler =

German born American economist

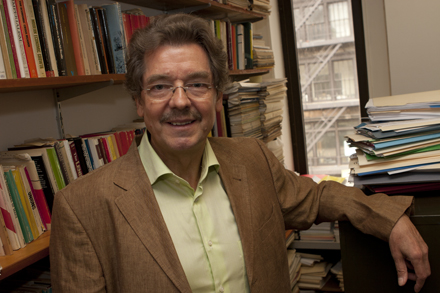

Academic background
- Education: LMU Munich, Free University of Berlin, Technische Universität Berlin, Germany
- Thesis: Zur multisektoralen Theorie der Kapitalreproduktion (1976)
- Doctoral advisor: Elmar Altvater

Academic work
- Discipline: macroeconomic dynamics, empirical macroeconomics, financial economics, macroeconomic policy, economics of climate change
- School or tradition: Keynesian economics
- Institutions: The New School
- Doctoral students: Mariana Mazzucato
- Website: NSSR profile, SSRN profile; Information at IDEAS / RePEc

Willi Semmler is a German-born American economist who currently teaches at The New School in New York.

== Academic career ==
Willi Semmler studied at LMU Munich, Technische Universität Berlin and Free University of Berlin. He has a PhD (Dr. rer. pol.) and a habilitation from the Free University of Berlin. He began his teaching career at the Free University of Berlin, was a Post-Doc at Columbia University, funded by the American Council of Learned Society, taught at the American University, Washington, D.C., and Bielefeld University, Germany. He is currently the Henry Arnhold Professor of International Cooperation and Development at the New School for Social Research, The New School, New York. He was research fellow at the Zentrum für Europäische Wirtschaftsforschung in Mannheim and is Senior Researcher at the International Institute for Applied Systems Analysis in Laxenburg, Austria. He was visitor at the CEPREMAP, Paris, Stanford University, and Japanese Universities.

== Theoretical contributions ==
Semmler's dissertation was on multisector growth theory. His research topics include classical economic dynamics, business cycles, macroeconomic dynamics, economic growth, global growth, environment and resources, macroeconomics and finance, financial economics, the economics of climate change, empirical macroeconomics and regime switching models, and numerical methods in economics.

== Applied work ==
US and EU macroeconomics, and monetary and fiscal policy, disparities in income and wealth distribution, dynamic portfolio decisions, financing climate policies, climate policies and green jobs, empirics of nonrenewable and renewable energy, and economic comments in Spiegel Online, see external links. Semmler's policy research has also been featured in working paper series of the World Bank, IMF, ECB, and ILO.

== Awards and Grants ==
Grant from the German Research Foundation, on Macroeconomics and Inequality, August 2015 – 2016

Grant from the German Research Foundation jointly with Stephan Klasen, on Infrastructure against Climate Risk, August 2012 – 2013, extension 2015–2016

Thyssen Foundation grant for a two-year speaker series on Global Warming and Renewable Energy, August 2012-August 2014, extension 2015–2020

One year grant from the Center for European Economics Research (ZEW), Mannheim, on a research project on Financial Stress and Economic Dynamics: Asymmetries within and Across European Countries, June 2012-June 2013

Fulbright Professorship, University of Economics, Vienna, 2012

Grant from the Walker Foundation on "The Economics of Global Warming II: Renewable Energy", September 2011

== Publications ==
- Using Nonlinear Model Predictive Control for Dynamic Decision Problems in Economics(with L. Gruene and M. Stieler), Journal of Economic Dynamics and Control, 60:112 133, 2015.
- Handbook on the Macroeconomics of Global Warming (edited with L. Bernard), Oxford University Press, 2015.
- The Real Consequences of Financial Stress (with S. Mittnik), Journal of Economic Dynamics and Control, vol. 37, no: 8, 2013.
- Asset Prices, Booms and Recessions, Financial Economics from a Dynamic Perspective, and Sustainable Asset Accumulation and Dynamic Portfolio decisions (2016), both Springer Publishing House. 2011.
- Filtering Time Series with Penalized Splines (with G. Kauermann and T. Krivobokova), Studies in Nonlinear Dynamics and Econometrics, vol 15, no:21-26, 2011;
- The US Wage Phillips Curve Across Frequencies and Over Time (with M. Gallegati, M. Gallegati, J. Ramsey), Oxford Bulletin of Economics and Statistics, vol. 73. no 4: 489–508. 2011.
- Financial Assets, debt and Liquidity Crisis (with M. Charpe, C. Chiarella, and P. Flaschel), Cambridge University Press, 2011.
- Global Environment, Natural Resources, and Economic Growth (with A. Greiner), Oxford University Press, 2008.
- The Forces of Economic Growth, A Time Series Perspective (with A. Greiner and G. Gong), Princeton University Press, 2005 (paper back 2016).
- Dynamic Macroeconomics, Instability, Fluctuations, and Growth in a Monetary Economy (with P. Flaschel and R. Franke), MIT Press, 1997.
- On Nonlinear Theories of Economic Cycles and the Persistence of Business Cycles, Journal of Mathematical Social Sciences, vol. 12, no 1, pp. 123–147, 1986.
- The Classical and Neoclassical Competitive Adjustment Processes (with P. Flaschel), The Manchester School of Economic and Social Studies 55(1):13-37, March, 1987.
- Zur Theorie der Reproduktion und Akkumulation. Bemerkungen zu neueren multisektoralen Ansätzen sowie Überlegungen zum Verhältnis von privatem und staatlichem Sektor, Free University of Berlin, published in German at Wolter Verlag Berlin. 1977.
