= Groß Sankt Florian =

- Municipality
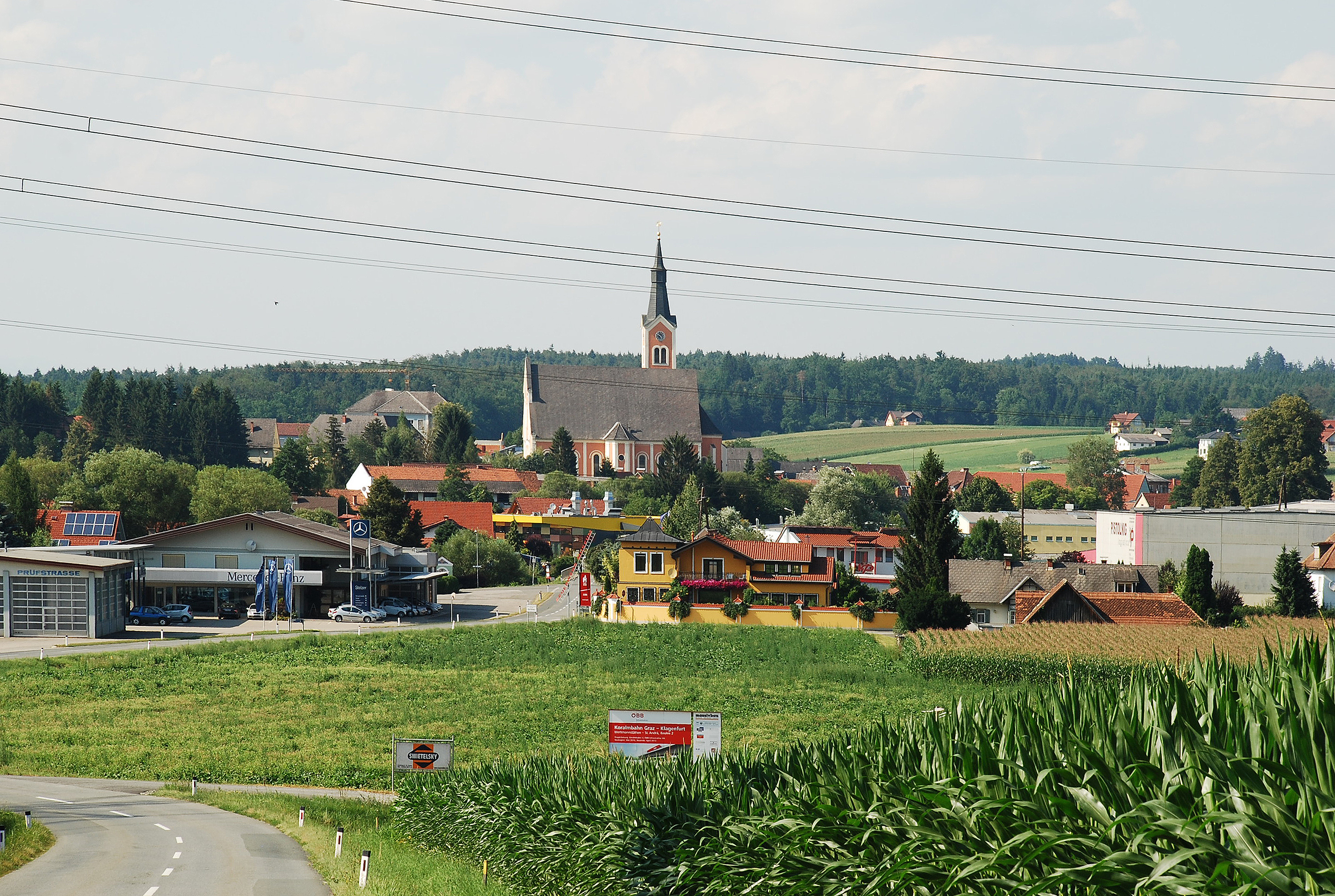
- View of Groß Sankt Florian

- Coat of arms

- Location within Austria Groß Sankt Florian (Styria)
- Coordinates: 46°49′28″N 15°19′07″E
- Country: Austria
- State: Styria
- District: Deutschlandsberg

Government
  - Mayor: Alois Resch (ÖVP)

Area
  - Total: 48.8 km^{2} (18.8 sq mi)
- Elevation: 317 m (1,040 ft)

Population (2018-01-01)
  - Total: 4,150
  - Density: 85.0/km^{2} (220/sq mi)
- Time zone: UTC+1 (CET)
  - Summer (DST): UTC+2 (CEST)
- Postal code: 8522
- Area code: 3464
- Vehicle registration: DL
- Website: www.gross-st-florian. steiermark.at

Groß Sankt Florian is a municipality in the district of Deutschlandsberg in the Austrian state of Styria.

== Geography ==
It is located in southern Austria, near Slovenia and is approximately 35 km from Graz.

== Population ==
Historical population
Year	Pop.	±%
1869	2,289	—
1880	2,377	+3.8%
1890	2,484	+4.5%
1900	2,624	+5.6%
1910	2,689	+2.5%
1923	2,563	−4.7%
1934	2,658	+3.7%
1939	2,503	−5.8%
1951	2,793	+11.6%
1961	2,826	+1.2%
1971	2,742	−3.0%
1981	2,826	+3.1%
1991	2,891	+2.3%
2001	1,973	−31.8%
2011	2,934	+48.7%

== Sights ==
Popular tourist attractions in the area include a Romanesque church from the 11th century and a museum of fire protection.
