= Marzahn-Hellersdorf 3 =

State electoral district of Germany

- Electoral district for the Berlin House of Representatives
- Marzahn-Hellersdorf 3 in 2026
- District: Marzahn-Hellersdorf
- Electorate: 34,408 (2026)

Current electoral district
- Party: AfD
- Member: Jeannette Auricht

Marzahn-Hellersdorf 3 is an electoral constituency (German: Wahlkreis) represented in the House of Representatives of Berlin. It elects one member via first-past-the-post voting.

== Geography ==
The constituency comprises the districts of Kienberg, Alt-Hellersdorf, north Hellersdorf, and west Hönow. It is entirely within the borough of Marzahn-Hellersdorf.

There were 34,408 eligible voters in 2026.

== Members ==
Election	Member	Party	%
1999	Bärbel Holzheuer-Rothensteiner	PDS	47.7
2001	Bärbel Holzheuer-Rothensteiner	PDS	52.3
2006	Bärbel Holzheuer-Rothensteiner	The Left	38.7
2011	Gabriele Hiller	The Left	33.4
2016	Jessica Bießmann	AfD	29.8
2021	Jeannette Auricht	AfD	22.0
2023	Jeannette Auricht	AfD	25.9
2026	Jeannette Auricht	AfD	43.4

== Election results ==
=== 2026 election ===
State election (2026): Marzahn-Hellersdorf 3
Notes:	Blue background denotes the winner of the electorate vote. Pink background denotes a candidate elected from their party list. Yellow background denotes an electorate win by a list member, or other incumbent. A ✓ or ✗ denotes status of any incumbent, win or lose respectively.						
Party	Candidate	Votes	%	±%	Party votes	%	±%
AfD	✓ Jeannette Auricht	9,060	43.4	▲17.5	8,946	42.3	▲17.1
Left	Nadine Jüngling	4,797	23.0	▲5.9	4,447	21.0	▲6.2
CDU	Robin Enderlein	2,585	12.4	▼12.4	2,108	10.0	▼14.6
BSW	Martin Rutsch	1,464	7.0		1,544	7.3	
SPD	Jeannette Shiferaw	1,363	6.5	▼9.0	1,383	6.5	▼8.4
Tierschutzpartei					947	4.5	Steady
Greens	Chantal Münster	728	3.5	▼0.5	757	3.6	▼0.7
Volt	Christopher Seedig	515	2.5		308	1.5	▲1.0
FDP	Benjamin Dahler	368	1.8	▼1.1	315	1.5	▼1.2
PARTEI					191	0.9	▼0.5
PdF					103	0.5	
DKP					35	0.2	▼0.1
ÖDP					34	0.2	▲0.1
du.					31	0.1	▼0.1
SGP					14	0.1	▼0.1
Informal votes		673			390		
Total valid votes		20,880			21,163		
Turnout		21,553	62.6	▲17.1			
AfD hold	Majority	4,263	20.4	▲19.2			

=== 2023 repeat election ===
Changes denoted below for the 2023 election are compared to the 2016 election, as the 2021 election was declared invalid.

State election (2023): Marzahn-Hellersdorf 3
Notes:	Blue background denotes the winner of the electorate vote. Pink background denotes a candidate elected from their party list. Yellow background denotes an electorate win by a list member, or other incumbent. A ✓ or ✗ denotes status of any incumbent, win or lose respectively.						
Party	Candidate	Votes	%	±%	Party votes	%	±%
AfD	Jeannette Auricht	3,865	25.9	▼3.9	3,765	25.2	▼3.3
CDU	Andrej Eckhardt	3,692	24.7	▲15.3	3,671	24.6	▲14.9
Left	Steffen Ostehr	2,552	17.1	▼11.0	2,217	14.8	▼9.4
SPD	Nicole Bienge	2,318	15.5	▼3.8	2,237	15.0	▼1.5
Tierschutzpartei	Narges Lieker	884	5.9		670	4.5	▲1.5
Greens	Chantal Münster	593	4.0	▼0.6	643	4.3	▲0.6
FDP	Peter Kastschajew	422	2.8	Steady	403	2.7	▲0.2
PARTEI	Andrea Simone Schulteisz	301	2.0		209	1.4	▲0.2
The Grays					152	1.0	
Gray Panthers					136	0.9	▼1.2
Verjüngungsforschung					110	0.7	▼0.3
dieBasis	Dietmar Lucas	192	1.3		94	0.6	
NPD	Andreas Käfer	104	0.7	▼2.1	103	0.7	▼2.1
Mieterpartei					82	0.5	
Pirates					70	0.5	▼1.3
FW					66	0.4	
Volt					66	0.4	
Bildet Berlin!					43	0.3	
DKP					34	0.2	Steady
du.					30	0.2	
SGP					29	0.2	Steady
Team Todenhöfer					29	0.2	
Humanists					28	0.2	
The Pinks/Alliance 21					15	0.1	
Klimaliste					14	0.1	
BüSo					10	0.1	▼0.1
ÖDP					10	0.1	
Bergpartei, die ÜberPartei					6	0.0	
LKR					3	0.0	▼0.6
Informal votes		221			204		
Total valid votes		14,923			14,945		
Turnout		15,158	45.5	▼5.7			
AfD hold	Majority	173	1.2				

=== 2021 election (annulled) ===
The election in 2021 was annulled and rerun in 2023.

State election (2021): Marzahn-Hellersdorf 3
Notes:	Blue background denotes the winner of the electorate vote. Pink background denotes a candidate elected from their party list. Yellow background denotes an electorate win by a list member, or other incumbent. A ✓ or ✗ denotes status of any incumbent, win or lose respectively.						
Party	Candidate	Votes	%	±%	Party votes	%	±%
AfD	Jeannette Auricht	4,335	22.0	▼7.8	4,138	20.9	▼7.6
Left	Steffen Ostehr	4,085	20.8	▼7.4	3,632	18.3	▼5.9
SPD	Nicole Bienge	4,037	20.5	▲1.2	3,944	19.9	▲3.4
CDU	Andrej Eckhardt	2,854	14.5	▲5.0	2,746	13.9	▲4.2
Tierschutzpartei	Narges Lieker	1,263	6.4		835	4.2	▲1.2
Greens	Chantal Münster	1,025	5.2	▲0.6	1,064	5.4	▲1.7
FDP	Peter Kastschajew	984	5.0	▲2.2	963	4.9	▲2.4
PARTEI	Andrea Simone Schulteisz	584	3.0		396	2.0	▲0.8
The Grays					281	1.4	
dieBasis	Dietmar Lucas	373	1.9		223	1.1	
Gray Panthers					213	1.1	▼1.0
FW					204	1.0	
APT					203	1.0	
Verjüngungsforschung					152	0.8	▼0.3
Mieterpartei					129	0.7	
Volt					122	0.6	
NPD	Andreas Käfer	146	0.7	▼2.1	119	0.6	▼2.2
Pirates					113	0.6	▼1.2
Team Todenhöfer					73	0.4	
du.					44	0.2	
Bildet Berlin!					42	0.2	
DKP					41	0.2	▼0.1
Humanists					35	0.2	
Klimaliste					26	0.1	
ÖDP					20	0.1	
LKR					20	0.1	▼0.5
BüSo					14	0.1	▼0.1
Bergpartei, die ÜberPartei					11	0.1	
The Pinks/Alliance 21					10	0.1	
SGP					8	0.0	▼0.1
Informal votes		363			303		
Total valid votes		19,686			19,821		
Turnout		20,156	60.9	▲9.7			
AfD hold	Majority	250	1.2				

== See also ==
- Politics of Berlin
- House of Representatives of Berlin
