= 2023 Berlin state election =

German state election

2023 Berlin repeat state election
- 12 February 2023

All 159 seats in the Abgeordnetenhaus of Berlin, including 29 overhang and leveling seats 80 seats needed for a majority
- Turnout: 1,529,558 (62.9%) ▼12.4pp
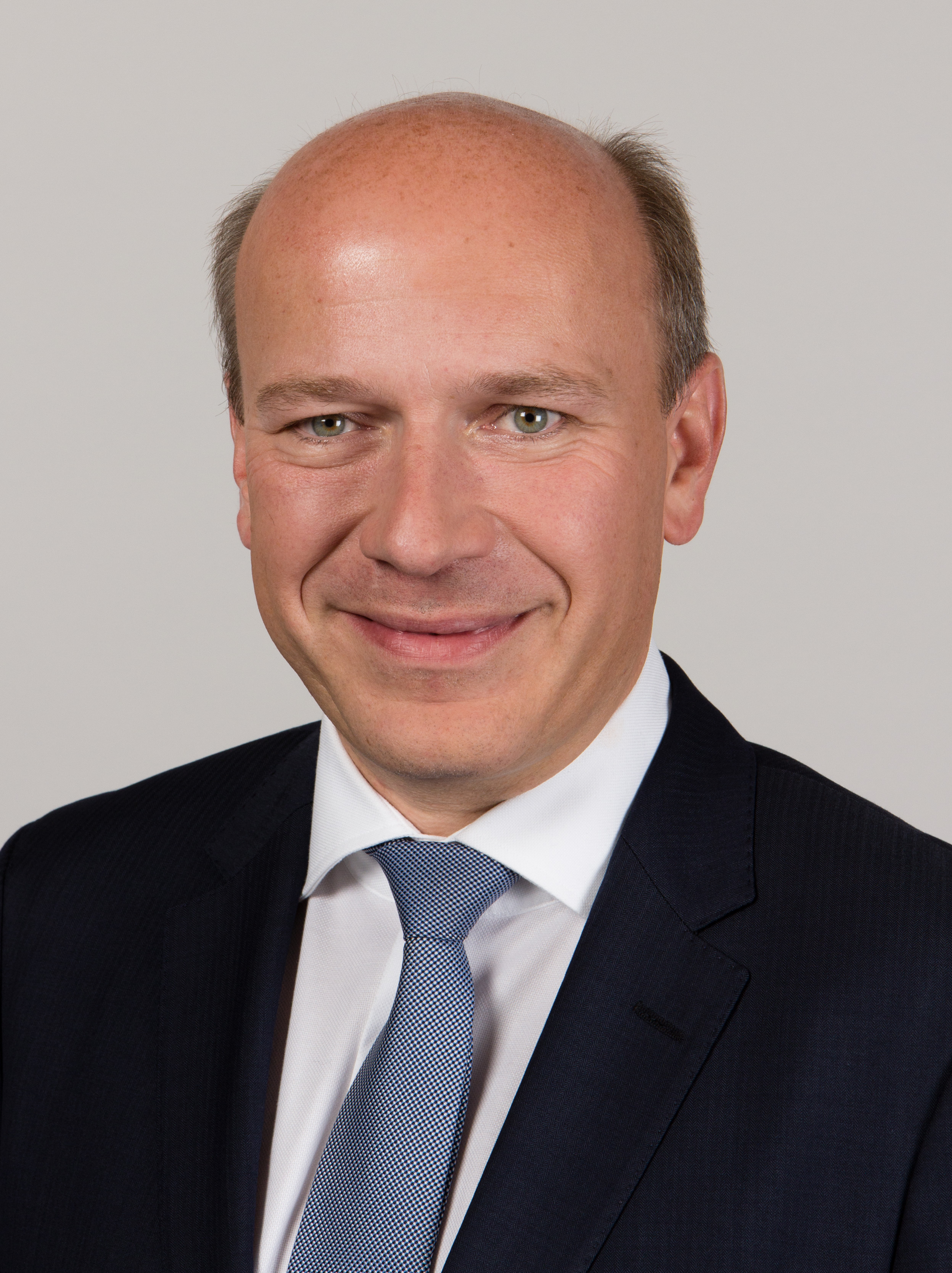

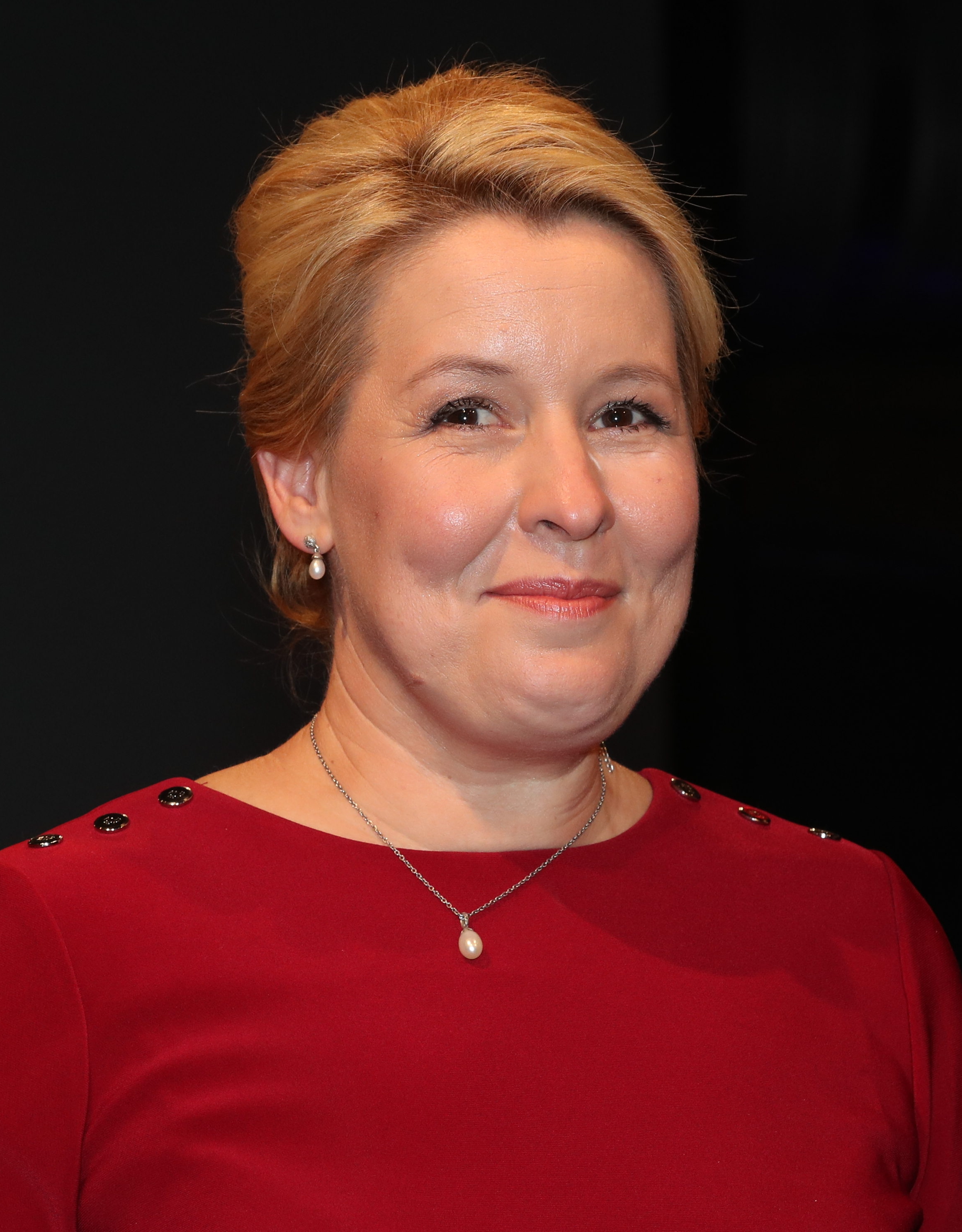

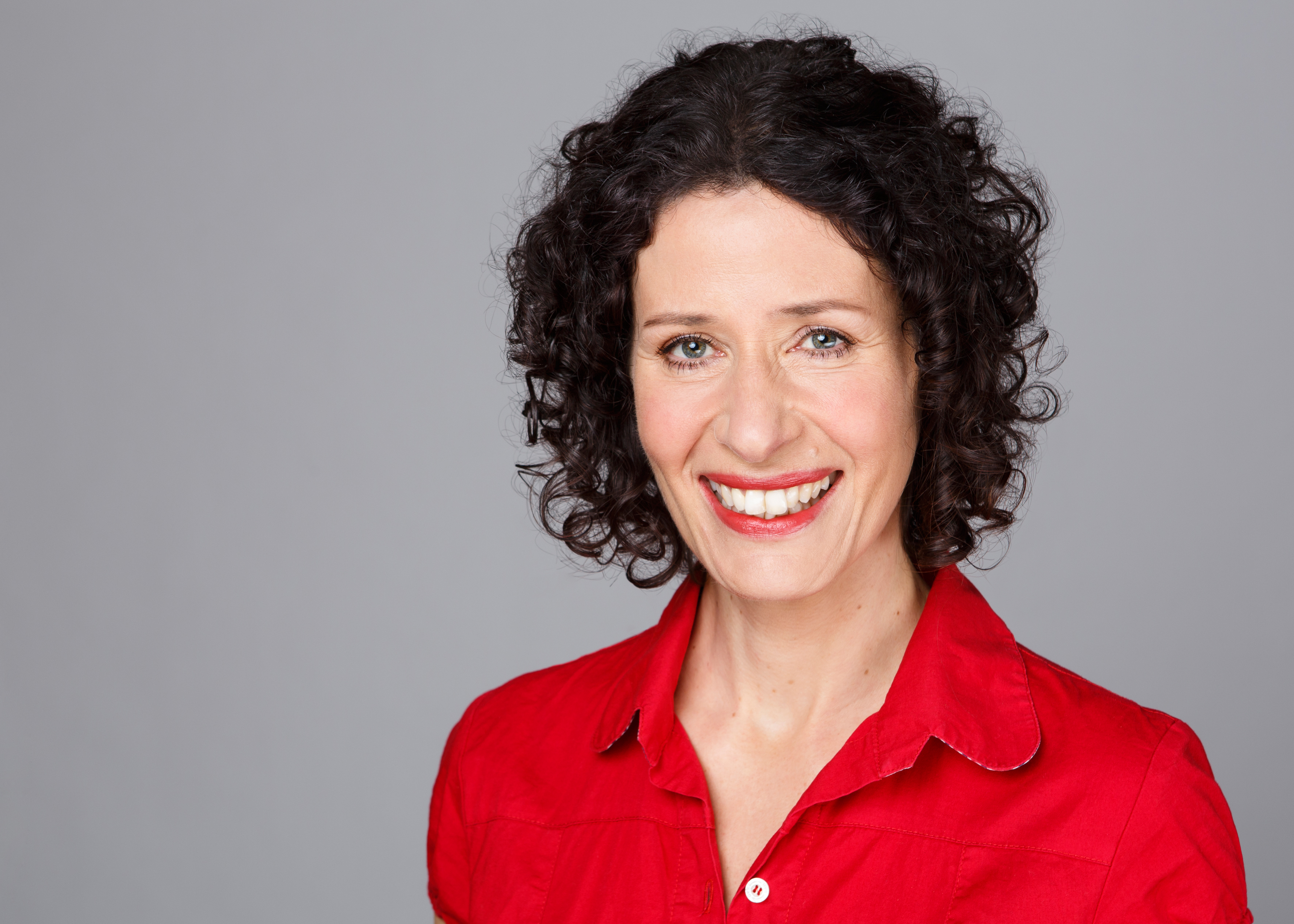

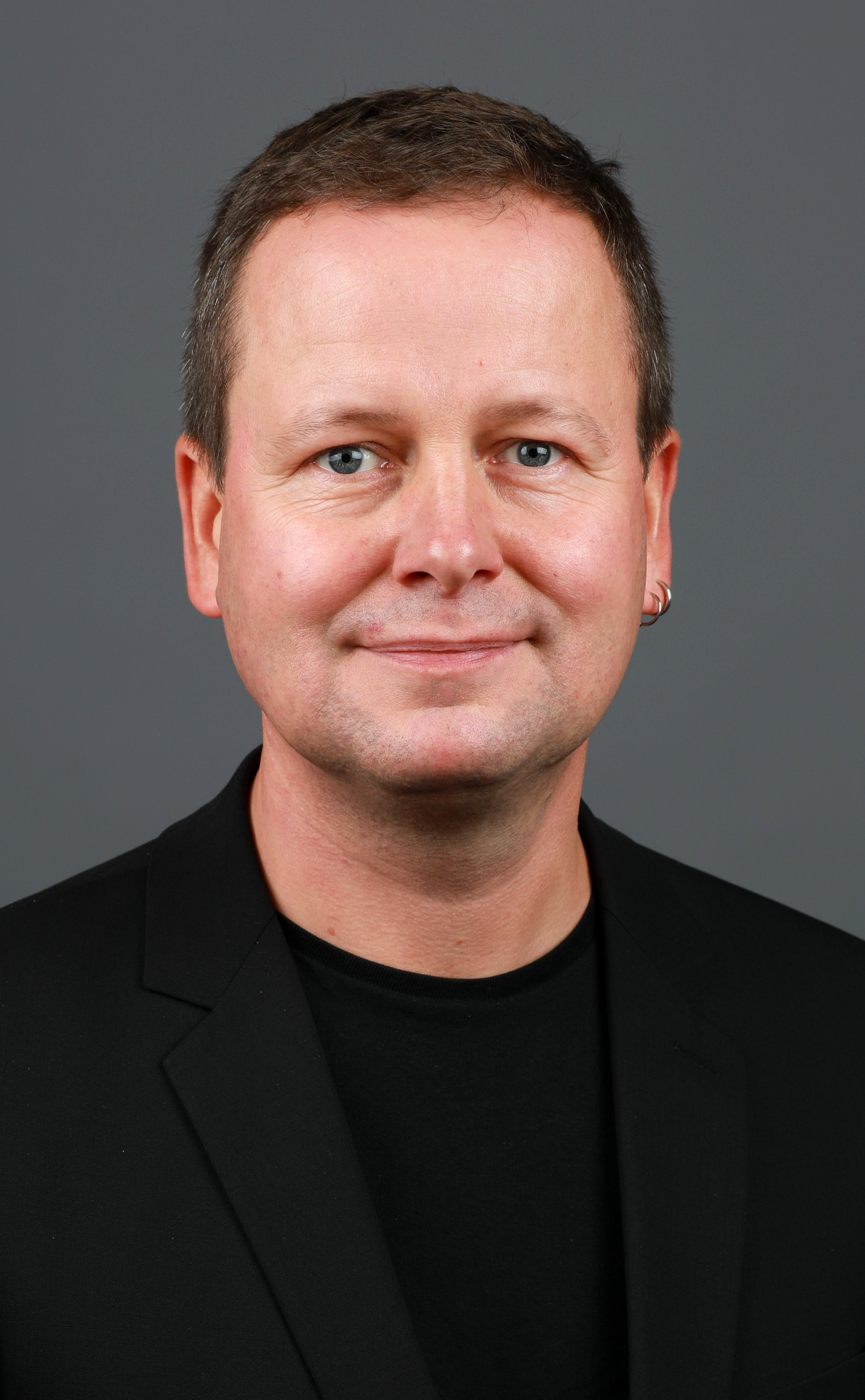

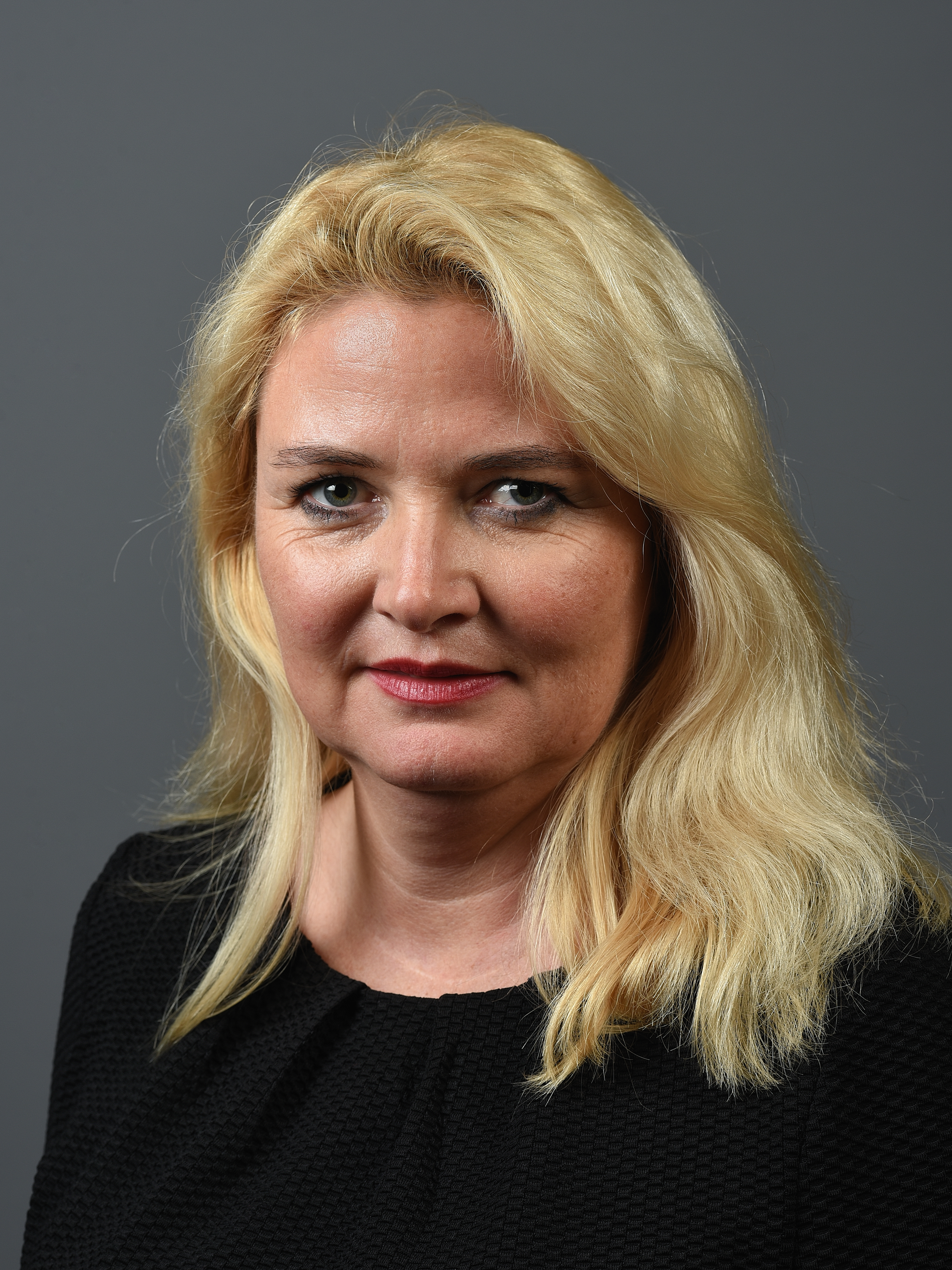

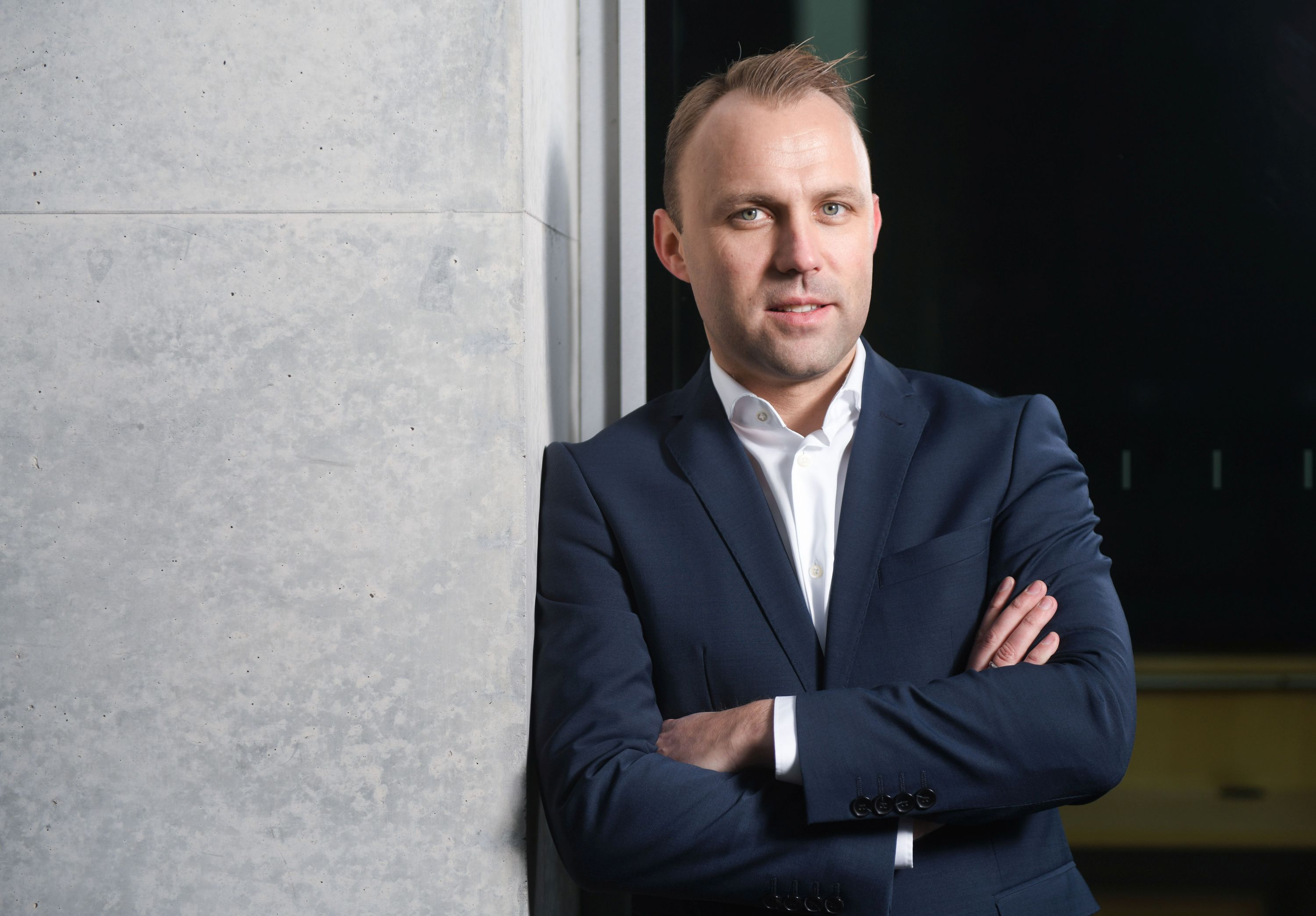
	First party	Second party	Third party
Candidate	Kai Wegner	Franziska Giffey	Bettina Jarasch
Party	CDU	SPD	Greens
Last election	30 seats, 18.0%	36 seats, 21.4%	32 seats, 18.9%
Seats won	52	34	34
Seat change	▲22	▼2	▲2
Popular vote	428,228	279,017	278,964
Percentage	28.2%	18.4%	18.4%
Swing	▲10.2pp	▼3.0pp	▼0.5pp
	Fourth party	Fifth party	Sixth party
Candidate	Klaus Lederer	Kristin Brinker	Sebastian Czaja
Party	Left	AfD	FDP
Last election	24 seats, 14.1%	13 seats, 8.0%	12 seats, 7.1%
Seats won	22	17	0
Seat change	▼2	▲4	▼12
Popular vote	185,119	137,871	70,416
Percentage	12.2%	9.1%	4.6%
Swing	▼1.9pp	▲1.1pp	▼2.5pp
- Results for single-member constituencies.
Government before election
Giffey senate
SPD–Green–Left
Elected Government
Wegner senate
CDU–SPD

The 2023 Berlin state election was held on 12 February 2023 to once again elect the 19th Abgeordnetenhaus of Berlin as the 2021 Berlin state election held on 26 September 2021 was declared invalid due to irregularities. Also affected were parts of the 2021 German federal election in Berlin. Those were repeated on 11 February 2024.

On 16 November 2022, the Constitutional Court of the State of Berlin declared the state election results invalid due to numerous irregularities and ordered a repeat election within 90 days. A decision by the Federal Constitutional Court regarding five constitutional complaints is still pending but would not be decided until after the repeat election. The improperly elected incumbent government was a coalition of the Social Democratic Party (SPD), The Greens, and The Left led by Governing Mayor Franziska Giffey. Alongside the Abgeordnetenhaus election, the boroughs of Berlin council results were also ruled invalid and repeat elections ordered for the same date.

With 28% of votes, the opposition Christian Democratic Union (CDU) grew by over ten percentage points and emerged as the largest party by a wide margin, the first time it had done so since the 1999 Berlin state election. All three governing parties declined; the SPD suffered its worst result in over a century with 18.4%, and only barely remained ahead of the Greens by a margin of 53 votes. The Left also slipped to 12%. The Alternative for Germany (AfD) recorded a small upswing to 9%, while the Free Democratic Party (FDP) fell to 4.6% and lost all their seats. Overall, the incumbent government retained a reduced majority. The CDU claimed a mandate to govern given its first-place result, while mayor Giffey committed to remaining in government. The Left called for a renewal of the outgoing coalition. After various talks between parties, the SPD and CDU voted at the beginning of March to begin negotiations for a grand coalition. CDU leader Kai Wegner was approved as mayor on 27 April after three rounds of voting.

== Election date ==
The original election to the 19th Abgeordnetenhaus of Berlin took place on 26 September 2021, but the results were ruled invalid by the Berlin Constitutional Court on 16 November 2022. A repeat election was ordered to take place within 90 days – 14 February 2023 at the latest. Constitutionally, the state parliament has a term of five years. The Court's decision did not reset the legislative term, meaning the next regular elections must still take place no later than Autumn 2026. State electoral officer Stephan Bröchler confirmed that the election would take place on Sunday 12 February, the latest possible date.

In accordance with the Constitutional Court's ruling, the sitting members of the Abgeordnetenhaus remained in office until the repeat election. They could have circumvented the court ruling by dissolving the state parliament and thus bringing about a snap election for a regular 20th legislative period, which is possible under the Berlin state constitution with a two-thirds majority of all members of parliament. However, this move was not seriously considered.

== Electoral system ==
The Abgeordnetenhaus is elected via mixed-member proportional representation. 78 members are elected in single-member constituencies via first-past-the-post voting. 52 members are then allocated using compensatory proportional representation, distributed in each of Berlin's twelve boroughs. Voters have two votes: the "first vote" for candidates in single-member constituencies, and the "second vote" for party lists, which are used to fill the proportional seats. The minimum size of the Abgeordnetenhaus is 130 members, but if overhang seats are present, proportional leveling seats will be added to ensure proportionality. An electoral threshold of 5% of valid votes is applied to the Abgeordnetenhaus; parties that fall below this threshold are excluded from the Abgeordnetenhaus. However, parties which win at least one single-member constituency are exempt from the threshold and will be allocated seats proportionally, even if they fall below 5%.

== Background ==
In the original election held on 26 September 2021, the SPD remained the largest party with 21.4% of the vote. The Greens grew to become the second-largest party with 18.9%, followed by the Christian Democratic Union (CDU) on 18.0%. The Left saw a small decline to 14.1%. The Alternative for Germany (AfD) lost almost half their voteshare and fell to 8.0%, while the Free Democratic Party (FDP) saw a small improvement to 7.1%. The SPD had led a coalition with the Left and Greens since 2016, which was returned with an increased majority. The government was subsequently renewed under new mayor Franziska Giffey.

Numerous irregularities were reported during the 2021 elections, including shortages of ballot papers, unusually long queues to vote, ballots being delivered to the wrong locations, and in some cases voters being turned away or offered only ballot papers for the federal election. After months of investigation and hearings, in September 2022, the Constitutional Court of the State of Berlin issued a preliminary assessment declaring that a full repeat of both the state and district council elections was likely necessary. This was confirmed by their official ruling in November. The results of the election were thus voided and new elections ordered for within 90 days.

== Parties ==
The table below lists parties previously represented in the 19th Abgeordnetenhaus of Berlin.

Name		Ideology	2021 result	
Name		Ideology	Votes (%)	Seats
SPD	Social Democratic Party of Germany; Sozialdemokratische Partei Deutschlands	Social democracy	21.4%	36 / 147
Grüne	Alliance 90/The Greens; Bündnis 90/Die Grünen	Green politics	18.9%	32 / 147
CDU	Christian Democratic Union of Germany; Christlich Demokratische Union Deutschlands	Christian democracy	18.0%	30 / 147
Linke	The Left; Die Linke	Democratic socialism	14.1%	24 / 147
AfD	Alternative for Germany; Alternative für Deutschland	Right-wing populism	8.0%	13 / 147
FDP	Free Democratic Party; Freie Demokratische Partei	Liberalism	7.1%	12 / 147

== Opinion polls ==
=== Graphical summary ===
Local regression of polls conducted.

=== Party polling ===
Polling firm	Fieldwork date	Sample size	SPD	Grüne	CDU	Linke	AfD	FDP	Others	Lead
2023 state election	12 Feb 2023	–	18.4	18.4	28.2	12.2	9.1	4.6	9.0	9.8
Wahlkreisprognose	8–10 Feb 2023	1,000	19.5	18.5	25	13	9	5	10	5.5
Forschungsgruppe Wahlen	8–9 Feb 2023	1,059	21	17	25	11	10	6	10	4
INSA	2–9 Feb 2023	1,000	19	18	25	12	10	6	10	6
Civey	2–9 Feb 2023	2,002	22	17	24	11	9	7	10	2
Forsa	30 Jan–3 Feb 2023	1,005	17	18	26	12	10	5	12	8
Forschungsgruppe Wahlen	31 Jan–2 Feb 2023	1,151	21	18	24	11	10	6	10	3
Wahlkreisprognose	31 Jan–2 Feb 2023	1,034	19	19	22	12.5	11.5	5.5	10.5	3
Infratest dimap	30 Jan–1 Feb 2023	1,540	19	18	25	12	10	6	10	6
Infratest dimap	12–16 Jan 2023	1,162	18	21	23	11	11	6	10	2
Wahlkreisprognose	6–9 Jan 2023	1,100	19.5	20	22.5	12.5	11	4	10.5	2.5
INSA	12–19 Dec 2022	1,000	21	20	21	12	10	6	10	Tie
Wahlkreisprognose	11–13 Dec 2022	1,456	20	20.5	20	12.5	11	5	11	0.5
Infratest dimap	17–21 Nov 2022	1,179	19	22	21	11	10	5	12	1
Wahlkreisprognose	16–17 Nov 2022	1,200	18.5	18.5	18.5	14.5	12	6.5	11.5	Tie
INSA	7–11 Nov 2022	1,000	20	20	21	12	10	7	10	1
Wahlkreisprognose	27–29 Oct 2022	1,311	19	19.5	19	14.5	12	5	11	0.5
Wahlkreisprognose	10–13 Oct 2022	1,100	18	19	21	14	13	5	10	2
Infratest dimap	13–17 Sep 2022	1,173	17	22	21	12	10	6	12	1
Wahlkreisprognose	8–12 Aug 2022	1,100	20.5	26.5	19	10.5	9	5	9.5	6
INSA	4–11 Jul 2022	1,000	20	21	20	12	8	7	12	1
INSA	10–15 Jun 2022	1,000	21	20	21	12	8	8	10	Tie
Wahlkreisprognose	18-25 May 2022	1,100	17	29.5	21	10.5	6.5	5.5	10	8.5
Infratest dimap	16–19 Mar 2022	1,170	20	21	20	12	8	8	11	1
INSA	6–13 Dec 2021	1,000	22	19	20	15	9	7	8	2
2021 state election	26 Sep 2021	–	21.4	18.9	18.0	14.1	8.0	7.1	12.5	2.5

=== West Berlin ===
Polling firm	Fieldwork date	Sample size	SPD	Grüne	CDU	Linke	AfD	FDP	Others	Lead
2023 state election	12 Feb 2023	–	19.9	19.8	31.1	9.0	6.8	5.3	8.1	11.2
Infratest dimap	30 Jan–2 Feb 2023	–	21	19	29	8	8	5	10	8
Infratest dimap	12–16 Jan 2023	–	20	22	27	8	9	5	9	5
Infratest dimap	17–21 Nov 2022	–	20	23	25	8	8	5	11	2
Wahlkreisprognose	10–13 Oct 2022	–	19	20.5	24	10.5	10.5	5.5	10	3.5
Infratest dimap	13–17 Sep 2022	–	17	24	24	8	8	7	12	Tie
Infratest dimap	16–19 Mar 2022	–	21	23	24	7	6	8	11	1
2021 state election	26 Sep 2021	–	22.9	20.3	20.8	10.1	6.3	7.9	11.7	2.1

=== East Berlin ===
Polling firm	Fieldwork date	Sample size	SPD	Linke	Grüne	CDU	AfD	FDP	Others	Lead
2023 state election	12 Feb 2023	–	16.4	16.6	16.4	24.3	12.2	3.7	10.4	7.7
Infratest dimap	31 Jan–2 Feb 2023	–	17	14	16	20	14	6	9	3
Infratest dimap	12–16 Jan 2023	–	17	14	18	18	15	6	12	Tie
Infratest dimap	17–21 Nov 2022	–	18	15	20	14	14	5	14	2
Wahlkreisprognose	10–13 Oct 2022	–	16	19.5	17.5	16.5	17	4	9.5	2
Infratest dimap	13–17 Sep 2022	–	17	16	20	17	12	5	13	3
Infratest dimap	16–19 Mar 2022	–	20	18	18	14	11	7	12	2
2021 state election	26 Sep 2021	–	19.4	19.4	17.0	14.3	10.3	6.1	11.7	Tie

== Results ==
Results of the party list vote by voting precinct (Wahlbezirk).

Party	Constituency				Party list				Total seats	+/–
Party	Votes	%	+/–	Seats	Votes	%	+/–	Seats	Total seats	+/–
Christian Democratic Union (CDU)	449,990	29.71	+10.06	48	428,228	28.23	+10.23	4	52	+22
Social Democratic Party (SPD)	301,851	19.93	–3.42	4	279,017	18.39	–3.02	30	34	–2
Alliance 90/The Greens (GRÜNE)	290,026	19.15	–0.83	20	278,964	18.39	–0.46	14	34	+2
The Left (LINKE)	186,473	12.31	–1.63	4	185,119	12.20	–1.85	18	22	–2
Alternative for Germany (AfD)	136,426	9.01	+0.94	2	137,871	9.09	+1.10	15	17	+4
Free Democratic Party (FDP)	58,381	3.85	–2.74	0	70,416	4.64	–2.50	0	0	–12
Human Environment Animal Protection Party	43,924	2.90	–0.47	0	36,273	2.39	+0.19	0	0	0
Die PARTEI	25,120	1.66	–0.35	0	21,570	1.42	–0.38	0	0	0
Volt Germany					14,047	0.93	–0.18	0	0	0
Grassroots Democratic Party	11,505	0.76	–0.89	0	8,342	0.55	–0.72	0	0	0
The Greys					6,447	0.43	–0.26	0	0	0
Team Todenhöfer					6,326	0.42	–0.61	0	0	0
Grey Panthers					6,275	0.41	–0.08	0	0	0
Pirate Party Germany	1,184	0.08	–0.01	0	5,145	0.34	–0.07	0	0	0
Climate List Berlin					4,103	0.27	–0.16	0	0	0
Free Voters	5,666	0.37	–0.56	0	3,923	0.26	–0.58	0	0	0
Renters' Party	973	0.06	±0.00	0	3,902	0.26	+0.03	0	0	0
Party for Health Research					3,768	0.25	–0.02	0	0	0
The Urbans. A HipHop Party	614	0.04	±0.00	0	2,993	0.20	±0.00	0	0	0
The Humanists					2,659	0.18	–0.03	0	0	0
German Communist Party					2,517	0.17	+0.04	0	0	0
Bildet Berlin!					1,790	0.12	–0.02	0	0	0
Ecological Democratic Party	643	0.04	–0.02	0	1,674	0.11	–0.02	0	0	0
National Democratic Party	566	0.04	–0.01	0	1,591	0.10	–0.03	0	0	0
Bergpartei, die "ÜberPartei"					1,137	0.07	–0.02	0	0	0
Socialist Equality Party					801	0.05	+0.02	0	0	0
The Pinks/Alliance 21	36	0.00	±0.00	0	786	0.05	±0.00	0	0	0
Liberal Conservative Reformers	382	0.03	–0.02	0	475	0.03	–0.04	0	0	0
Civil Rights Movement Solidarity					409	0.03	±0.00	0	0	0
Human World					163	0.01	±0.00	0	0	0
The New Democrats					69	0.00	–0.00	0	0	0
The Republicans	15	0.00	±0.00	0	44	0.00	±0.00	0	0	0
German Conservative					16	0.00	±0.00	0	0	0
The Women	111	0.01	±0.00	0					0	0
Liberal Democrats	30	0.00	±0.00	0					0	0
Democratic Left	22	0.00	±0.00	0					0	0
Independents	629	0.04	–0.02	0					0	0
Total	1,514,567	100.00	–	78	1,516,860	100.00	–	81	159	+12
Valid votes	1,514,567	99.02			1,516,860	99.17				
Invalid/blank votes	14,991	0.98			12,698	0.83				
Total votes	1,529,558	100.00			1,529,558	100.00				
Registered voters/turnout	2,431,776	62.90			2,431,776	62.90				

Popular vote
CDU	28.23%
SPD	18.39%
GRÜNE	18.39%
LINKE	12.20%
AfD	9.09%
FDP	4.64%
Other	9.06%

Abgeordnetenhaus seats
CDU	32.70%
SPD	21.38%
GRÜNE	21.38%
LINKE	13.84%
AfD	10.69%

	SPD	CDU/CSU	Linke	Grüne	FDP	AfD	Others
West Berlin	19.9	31.1	9.0	19.8	5.3	6.8	7.7
East Berlin	16.4	24.3	16.6	16.4	3.7	12.2	10.3

CDU vote

SPD vote

Green vote

Linke vote

AfD vote

FDP vote

=== By constituency ===
Constituency	Personal vote				List vote						
Constituency	Previous member	Elected member	%	Margin	CDU	SPD	Grüne	Linke	AfD	FDP	Other
Mitte 1	Silke Gebel	Silke Gebel	33.5	11.6	20.6	15.2	30.6	12.8	4.1	8.0	8.7
Mitte 2	Max Landero	Lucas Schaal	24.9	3.4	24.2	17.6	19.5	17.6	7.1	6.2	7.8
Mitte 3	Jian Omar	Jian Omar	22.0	10.7	22.2	18.4	28.1	12.4	4.6	6.1	8.1
Mitte 4	Taylan Kurt	Taylan Kurt	40.1	22.6	15.6	14.7	34.3	16.8	4.6	3.8	10.2
Mitte 5	Mathias Schulz	Sven Rissmann	24.4	1.9	24.1	18.4	21.7	14.1	8.5	3.2	10.1
Mitte 6	Tuba Bozkurt	Tuba Bozkurt	32.0	10.9	14.7	14.8	28.7	21.5	5.4	2.8	12.0
Mitte 7	Laura Neugebauer	Laura Neugebauer	30.1	10.8	17.8	16.4	28.5	17.6	5.6	3.5	10.7
Friedrichshain-Kreuzberg 1	Katrin Schmidberger	Katrin Schmidberger	40.3	23.1	14.3	16.1	37.0	17.4	2.6	3.8	9.0
Friedrichshain-Kreuzberg 2	Marianne Burkert-Eulitz	Marianne Burkert-Eulitz	37.9	10.8	10.2	12.7	38.3	24.4	2.0	2.4	10.0
Friedrichshain-Kreuzberg 3	Turgut Altuğ	Turgut Altuğ	35.1	15.3	14.4	15.8	32.9	21.6	2.9	2.4	10.1
Friedrichshain-Kreuzberg 4	Damiano Valgolio	Damiano Valgolio	24.7	2.4	18.2	17.1	22.4	21.5	6.9	3.6	10.4
Friedrichshain-Kreuzberg 5	Vasili Franco	Vasili Franco	36.1	14.2	11.1	13.5	33.9	21.9	4.2	3.3	12.0
Friedrichshain-Kreuzberg 6	Julian Schwarze	Julian Schwarze	39.6	19.8	12.2	12.8	36.5	20.1	3.4	4.2	10.8
Pankow 1	Johannes Kraft	Johannes Kraft	41.6	25.8	33.6	16.2	9.4	11.0	17.0	3.4	9.4
Pankow 2	Torsten Hofer	Lars Bocian	31.4	12.3	29.6	17.6	14.2	11.9	13.1	4.4	9.2
Pankow 3	Oda Hassepaß	Oda Hassepaß	24.8	3.3	20.3	17.1	23.0	16.6	9.2	3.4	10.4
Pankow 4	Dennis Buchner	Dirk Stettner	30.2	10.4	28.9	18.0	12.1	14.3	13.6	3.2	9.9
Pankow 5	Louis Krüger	Louis Krüger	22.1	1.3	20.6	17.4	19.6	17.6	10.4	3.1	11.3
Pankow 6	Andreas Otto	Andreas Otto	41.6	23.3	12.1	13.2	37.8	19.1	3.5	4.3	9.9
Pankow 7	Julia Schneider	Julia Schneider	30.9	12.5	16.1	14.9	27.5	18.8	7.3	3.6	11.8
Pankow 8	Daniela Billig	Daniela Billig	37.2	19.0	14.4	13.6	34.3	18.7	3.9	5.6	9.6
Pankow 9	Tino Schopf	Tino Schopf	25.6	1.3	17.7	17.5	24.6	18.0	7.9	4.0	10.3
Charlottenburg-Wilmersdorf 1	Christian Hochgrebe	Stefan Häntsch	28.3	5.0	27.4	20.8	20.2	8.8	8.0	5.4	9.3
Charlottenburg-Wilmersdorf 2	Ariturel Hack	Ariturel Hack	38.7	18.1	35.5	20.6	18.4	5.6	5.4	8.0	6.4
Charlottenburg-Wilmersdorf 3	Petra Vandrey	Petra Vandrey	29.2	3.1	24.1	20.7	27.3	10.1	4.2	6.3	7.3
Charlottenburg-Wilmersdorf 4	Christoph Wapler	Aldona Niemczyk	28.6	2.6	27.9	20.1	24.2	8.2	4.7	8.0	6.8
Charlottenburg-Wilmersdorf 5	Sandra Khalatbari	Sandra Khalatbari	42.3	22.2	39.0	18.8	16.0	5.2	5.4	9.9	5.7
Charlottenburg-Wilmersdorf 6	Alexander Kaas Elias	Peer Mock-Stümer	29.2	3.6	27.6	21.6	24.2	8.6	4.4	7.0	6.6
Charlottenburg-Wilmersdorf 7	Florian Dörstelmann	Stefanie Bung	34.2	10.3	31.9	22.1	20.1	7.3	5.5	6.3	6.8
Spandau 1	Sebahat Atli	Bettina Meißner	37.3	12.8	37.2	22.2	9.6	4.8	12.2	4.1	9.9
Spandau 2	Raed Saleh	Ersin Nas	33.2	7.2	33.9	23.0	9.8	5.6	12.8	3.8	11.1
Spandau 3	Stephan Machulik	Kerstin Brauner	34.4	10.5	34.4	21.2	12.1	5.9	10.8	4.5	11.0
Spandau 4	Heiko Melzer	Heiko Melzer	45.3	22.3	43.9	21.2	7.8	3.5	11.3	4.1	8.3
Spandau 5	Kai Wegner	Kai Wegner	46.9	24.9	43.9	20.4	11.2	3.3	8.5	6.0	6.8
Steglitz-Zehlendorf 1	Benedikt Lux	Claudia Wein	30.2	1.6	28.7	20.5	23.4	7.6	5.3	6.5	7.9
Steglitz-Zehlendorf 2	Matthias Kollatz-Ahnen	Tom Cywinski	31.3	7.2	30.1	21.6	20.7	7.0	6.0	6.3	8.3
Steglitz-Zehlendorf 3	Christian Goiny	Christian Goiny	40.5	18.8	36.8	20.4	18.0	4.9	5.0	8.7	6.2
Steglitz-Zehlendorf 4	Cornelia Seibeld	Cornelia Seibeld	41.8	19.7	39.0	21.0	14.8	4.7	6.6	6.9	6.9
Steglitz-Zehlendorf 5	Oliver Friederici	Oliver Friederici	41.2	19.9	38.3	20.6	13.5	4.9	8.2	6.3	8.2
Steglitz-Zehlendorf 6	Adrian Grasse	Adrian Grasse	40.0	19.6	36.6	18.8	19.2	5.4	4.8	9.5	5.8
Steglitz-Zehlendorf 7	Stephan Standfuß	Stephan Standfuß	40.1	20.2	38.4	18.7	18.1	4.1	4.8	10.7	5.2
Tempelhof-Schöneberg 1	Sebastian Walter	Sebastian Walter	34.4	12.4	21.1	19.3	31.1	12.3	4.0	4.7	7.4
Tempelhof-Schöneberg 2	Catherina Pieroth-Manelli	Catherina Pieroth-Manelli	36.9	14.9	17.2	19.3	34.2	13.5	3.7	3.7	8.5
Tempelhof-Schöneberg 3	Orkan Özdemir	Orkan Özdemir	32.1	26.8	23.0	21.9	30.0	9.1	4.0	4.7	7.4
Tempelhof-Schöneberg 4	Aferdita Suka	Frank Luhmann	28.5	2.1	27.8	19.1	23.3	10.2	5.8	3.9	9.9
Tempelhof-Schöneberg 5	Lars Rauchfuß	Roman Simon	40.3	18.0	38.5	20.3	12.1	6.4	8.7	4.9	9.1
Tempelhof-Schöneberg 6	Scott Körber	Scott Körber	47.4	20.7	45.6	20.0	9.1	3.8	9.6	4.8	7.1
Tempelhof-Schöneberg 7	Christian Zander	Christian Zander	49.6	30.0	47.3	19.2	9.0	3.6	8.9	5.4	6.6
Neukölln 1	André Schulze	André Schulze	35.1	8.8	10.3	14.4	35.4	24.8	3.4	1.8	9.9
Neukölln 2	Susanna Kahlefeld	Susanna Kahlefeld	34.5	3.8	9.7	14.3	35.8	25.7	3.4	1.8	9.4
Neukölln 3	Derya Çağlar	Derya Çağlar	23.4	2.3	20.0	20.3	22.8	17.6	6.5	2.5	10.2
Neukölln 4	Marcel Hopp	Christopher Förster	43.0	13.3	41.2	27.5	5.2	4.6	10.6	3.6	7.2
Neukölln 5	Nina Lerch	Robin Juhnke	43.1	18.2	40.3	25.3	8.5	4.4	9.9	4.4	7.2
Neukölln 6	Franziska Giffey	Olaf Schenk	45.3	15.7	43.9	25.2	5.6	3.6	10.8	4.2	6.6
Treptow-Köpenick 1	Katalin Gennburg	Katalin Gennburg	25.9	6.6	18.3	15.8	21.3	20.9	9.8	3.1	10.8
Treptow-Köpenick 2	Lars Düsterhöft	Lars Düsterhöft	29.2	8.2	22.1	20.4	12.4	16.4	13.5	3.4	11.7
Treptow-Köpenick 3	Ellen Haußdörfer	Stefan Evers	32.7	13.7	30.6	17.4	8.7	12.2	17.0	3.6	10.5
Treptow-Köpenick 4	Robert Schaddach	Lisa Knack	27.2	3.6	28.4	17.9	11.1	14.5	13.9	4.3	9.9
Treptow-Köpenick 5	Tom Schreiber	Martin Sattelkau	27.7	4.8	27.6	18.9	7.0	14.8	17.6	4.1	10.0
Treptow-Köpenick 6	Dunja Wolff	Maik Penn	31.6	13.2	29.0	17.8	12.1	16.2	12.2	3.6	9.1
Marzahn-Hellersdorf 1	Gunnar Lindemann	Gunnar Lindemann	28.8	6.8	22.9	15.0	3.5	16.0	28.0	2.2	12.3
Marzahn-Hellersdorf 2	Manuela Schmidt	Olga Gauks	25.5	4.6	26.9	18.1	4.1	17.5	20.4	2.5	10.5
Marzahn-Hellersdorf 3	Jeannette Auricht	Jeannette Auricht	25.9	1.2	24.6	15.0	4.3	14.8	25.2	2.7	13.4
Marzahn-Hellersdorf 4	Christian Gräff	Christian Gräff	42.9	27.9	36.5	15.7	6.8	14.4	14.7	3.0	9.0
Marzahn-Hellersdorf 5	Katharina Günther-Wünsch	Katharina Günther-Wünsch	45.0	29.6	40.1	16.2	7.5	11.5	13.3	4.0	7.4
Marzahn-Hellersdorf 6	Alexander J. Herrmann	Alexander J. Herrmann	37.8	18.4	31.9	15.3	5.0	14.3	20.2	2.6	10.9
Lichtenberg 1	Danny Freymark	Danny Freymark	40.8	20.8	34.7	14.0	4.0	14.4	20.9	2.1	9.9
Lichtenberg 2	Martin Pätzold	Martin Pätzold	39.5	22.6	34.6	14.9	6.9	15.9	15.3	2.9	9.6
Lichtenberg 3	Claudia Engelmann	Dennis Haustein	23.4	0.1	23.1	18.5	9.0	19.5	14.6	3.1	12.2
Lichtenberg 4	Sebastian Schlüsselburg	Sebastian Schlüsselburg	27.2	8.1	18.0	16.8	17.3	21.9	10.7	3.0	12.3
Lichtenberg 5	Hendrikje Klein	Hendrikje Klein	25.0	5.2	19.8	15.9	15.0	20.9	12.7	2.9	12.7
Lichtenberg 6	Andreas Geisel	Lilia Usik	22.4	0.7	23.2	17.2	16.6	18.4	9.9	4.0	10.7
Reinickendorf 1	Bettina König	Burkard Dregger	37.2	14.2	34.5	19.3	12.6	8.2	11.8	3.0	10.6
Reinickendorf 2	Jörg Stroedter	Emine Demirbüken-Wegner	38.9	16.1	38.0	20.5	9.5	5.4	13.0	3.9	9.7
Reinickendorf 3	Stephan Schmidt	Stephan Schmidt	44.1	21.8	41.7	20.7	12.9	3.4	8.3	5.9	7.1
Reinickendorf 4	Björn Wohlert	Björn Wohlert	41.3	18.0	39.6	20.7	12.4	4.1	9.9	4.8	8.6
Reinickendorf 5	Michael Dietmann	Michael Dietmann	43.8	21.3	41.0	21.8	6.6	3.9	14.4	3.8	8.6
Reinickendorf 6	Frank Balzer	Frank Balzer	45.7	25.4	44.0	19.0	15.3	3.5	6.0	6.8	5.6
Berlin	N/A				28.2	18.4	18.4	12.2	9.1	4.6	9.0

== Government formation ==
Despite the CDU's strong result and insistence on a mandate to govern, the incumbent coalition of the SPD, Greens, and Left retained its majority. In the wake of the election, numerous outlets mentioned the likelihood that the CDU would remain in opposition. While preliminary results left a degree of doubt as to whether the SPD or Greens had placed second, initial talks began with a tentative assumption that the SPD had finished ahead. The CDU met separately with the SPD and Greens on 17 February for about four hours each. The atmosphere at the former was described as cool and the latter was friendly and cordial; the SPD were noted as being significantly closer to the CDU on policy compared to the Greens. Further CDU–SPD and CDU–Green discussions took place the next week, as did meetings between the SPD, Greens, and Left.

With all parties except The Left remaining publicly noncommital, speculation began to grow of a CDU-led government rather than a rapid renewal of the outgoing coalition as many expected. Franziska Giffey pushed for clarification on expropriation, after the 2021 Berlin referendum, as a precondition for the SPD to join any coalition, a policy area where the CDU and SPD were noticeably close. RBB suggested that Giffey could be handed a "super portfolio" in a CDU–SPD coalition. The Tagesspiegel also reported that former interior minister and urban development minister Andreas Geisel of the SPD would likely not be appointed to the next cabinet, regardless of coalition, due to his failure of responsibility in overseeing the 2021 election.

Polling conducted by Civey between 17 and 23 February indicated that 45% of voters preferred a CDU–SPD coalition, followed by SPD–Green–Left with 26%, and 11% for CDU–Green. The final results of the election were published on 27 February, clarifying that the SPD had finished ahead of the Greens, albeit by an even narrower margin of 53 votes. The Left voted on 28 February to seek a continuation of the coalition with the SPD and Greens. The three parties announced that they had come to an acceptable agreement on expropriation during the course of their discussions. Specifics were not given, but they spoke of a multi-stage process which would be based on the advice of the expert commission.

On 1 March, the SPD state board voted 25 to 12 in favour of seeking coalition negotiations with the CDU. The CDU board unanimously reciprocated the following day. Kai Wegner stated that, while talks had been productive with the Greens, they found greater overlap with the SPD. He also said that while the two still disagreed on a number of points, he commented that "new trust" emerged during exploratory talks. He voiced willingness to compromise on the anti-discrimination law, which the CDU committed to repealing during the campaign, and called for greater tenant protection and housing construction rather than expropriation, as was approved in the 2021 referendum, to solve the housing crisis. He outlined the prospective coalition policy as ensuring the basics work, namely "making sure Berlin is a safe and clean city where police get modern equipment", with a mobility policy that works for everyone – drivers as well as cyclists and pedestrians.

Giffey said that the decision to seek a coalition with the CDU was influenced by "respect for the election result", as well as a desire to prevent a CDU–Green coalition, under which she stated that social issues would be left behind. She described the outgoing coalition as "crisis-ridden" for which she blamed the Greens, pointing to conflict over the SPD's 29-euro ticket policy and housing construction, and accused them of a lack of respect for her leadership. The Greens and Left expressed outrage at the SPD's decision; both stated that they were not informed before the public announcement and that another round of talks had already been agreed on. Bettina Jarasch accused them of "slamming the door" and Silke Gebel described their actions as a breach of trust. Katina Schubert called it "incomprehensible", while Klaus Lederer said that responsibility lay solely with the SPD, saying "there is nothing insurmountable [between the parties]". The SPD's youth branch Jusos also spoke out in strong opposition to a coalition with the CDU, with chairman Peter Maaß describing the party as a real estate lobby. The group announced they would campaign to reject the coalition agreement when presented to the party membership for approval.

The CDU and SPD working groups began negotiations on 13 March. They planned to conclude a coalition pact within three weeks to give the SPD time for its membership vote, and install the new government at the start of May. Giffey clarified the same day that, if negotiations failed, the SPD would not resume talks with the Greens and Left but go into opposition and force the CDU and Greens to form government instead. The CDU and SPD presented the 135-page coalition agreement on 3 April, titled The Best for Berlin. The terms were generally interpreted as a win for the SPD. Despite the CDU's clear lead, the new Senate was to be divided evenly with five posts for each party. The crucial portfolios of urban development and interior were given to the SPD. The agreement also featured a number of flagship SPD policies on housing as well as the 29-euro ticket, and preserved the anti-discrimination law and automatic minimum wage increases, both of which the CDU had sought to repeal. This was attributed in part to the requirement that the SPD membership approve the coalition, which may have enticed the CDU to make further concessions.

The results of the SPD membership ballot were announced on 23 April. The coalition pact was approved by a narrow margin of 54.3%. Of 18,556 members, 11,866 voted, corresponding to a turnout of 63.9%. 6,179 voted in favour and 5,200 voted against. The agreement was unanimously approved by the CDU at a party conference the following day and officially signed by both parties. Wegner was elected as mayor by the Abgeordnetenhaus on 27 April. He failed to win on the first two ballots, likely due to dissenting SPD deputies refusing to support him. After the second ballot, the parliamentary elder council was convened to clarify procedure and legal questions, since a third ballot for Governing Mayor had never taken place before. The Greens and Left unsuccessfully requested that the ballot be postponed. Wegner was successful on the third ballot with 86 votes in favour, corresponding to the number of seats held by the incoming coalition. He received 70 votes against and three abstentions. The AfD claimed to have voted for him on the third ballot, criticising what they called the coalition's "obvious inability" to create majorities and insisting they were taking on responsibility. Wegner rejected the suggestion that he garnered any support from AfD deputies, as did the SPD faction, who described the AfD's claims as disinformation. Since the voting was conducted via secret ballot, the AfD's claim cannot be verified, and it is unclear whether Wegner relied on their votes for his election.

Governing Mayor election Kai Wegner (CDU)
Ballot →	27 April 2023		
Required majority →	80 out of 159	80 out of 159	Simple majority
For	71 / 159	79 / 159	86 / 159
Against	86 / 159	79 / 159	70 / 159
Abstentions	1 / 159	1 / 159	3 / 159
Invalid	1 / 159	0 / 159	0 / 159
