= Marzahn-Hellersdorf 6 =

State electoral district of Germany

- Electoral district for the Berlin House of Representatives
- Marzahn-Hellersdorf 6 in 2026
- District: Marzahn-Hellersdorf
- Electorate: 30,966 (2026)

Current electoral district
- Party: AfD
- Member: Jörn Geißler

Marzahn-Hellersdorf 6 is an electoral constituency (German: Wahlkreis) represented in the House of Representatives of Berlin. It elects one member via first-past-the-post voting.

== Geography ==
The constituency comprises the areas of Kaulsdorf North and Hellersdorf South. It is entirely within the borough of Marzahn-Hellersdorf.

There were 30,966 eligible voters in 2026.

== Members ==
| Election | Member | Party | % |
|---|---|---|---|
| 1999 | Wolfgang Girnus | PDS | 49.9 |
| 2001 | Thomas Flierl | PDS | 53.8 |
| 2006 | Thomas Flierl | The Left | 38.2 |
| 2011 | Sven Kohlmeier | SPD | 33.4 |
| 2016 | Kristian Ronneburg | The Left | 25.3 |
| 2021 | Alexander Herrmann | CDU | 27.9 |
| 2023 | Alexander Herrmann | CDU | 37.7 |
| 2026 | Jörn Geißler | AfD | 33.9 |

== Election results ==
=== 2026 election ===
State election (2026): Marzahn-Hellersdorf 6
| Notes: | Blue background denotes the winner of the electorate vote. Pink background denotes a candidate elected from their party list. Yellow background denotes an electorate win by a list member, or other incumbent. A ✓ or ✗ denotes status of any incumbent, win or lose respectively. | | | | | | |
| Party | Candidate | Votes | % | ±% | Party votes | % | ±% |
|---|---|---|---|---|---|---|---|
| AfD | Jörn Geißler | 6,889 | 33.9 | ▲14.5 | 7,400 | 36.2 | ▲16.0 |
| CDU | ✗ Alexander Herrmann | 5,805 | 28.5 | ▼9.2 | 3,431 | 16.8 | ▼15.1 |
| Left | Steffen Ostehr | 3,757 | 18.5 | ▲3.3 | 4,033 | 19.7 | ▲5.5 |
| SPD | Jan Lehmann | 1,411 | 6.9 | ▼7.1 | 1,547 | 7.6 | ▼7.7 |
| BSW | Martin Mnich | 1,225 | 6.0 | | 1,473 | 7.2 | |
| Greens | Gina Heinecke | 647 | 3.2 | ▼1.3 | 875 | 4.3 | ▼0.7 |
| Tierschutzpartei | | | | | 708 | 3.5 | ▼0.1 |
| Volt | Leonard Lange | 308 | 1.5 | | 273 | 1.3 | ▲0.9 |
| FDP | Dominik Sussmann | 305 | 1.5 | ▼0.5 | 362 | 1.8 | ▼0.8 |
| PARTEI | | | | | 146 | 0.7 | ▼0.5 |
| PdF | | | | | 93 | 0.5 | |
| DKP | | | | | 38 | 0.2 | ▼0.1 |
| ÖDP | | | | | 30 | 0.1 | ▲0.1 |
| du. | | | | | 21 | 0.1 | Steady |
| SGP | | | | | 13 | 0.1 | Steady |
| Informal votes | | 467 | | | 371 | | |
| Total valid votes | | 20,347 | | | 20,443 | | |
| Turnout | | 20,814 | 67.2 | ▲13.9 | | | |
| AfD gain from CDU | Majority | 1,084 | 5.4 | | | | |

=== 2023 repeat election ===
Changes denoted below for the 2023 election are compared to the 2016 election, as the 2021 election was declared invalid.

State election (2023): Marzahn-Hellersdorf 6
| Notes: | Blue background denotes the winner of the electorate vote. Pink background denotes a candidate elected from their party list. Yellow background denotes an electorate win by a list member, or other incumbent. A ✓ or ✗ denotes status of any incumbent, win or lose respectively. | | | | | | |
| Party | Candidate | Votes | % | ±% | Party votes | % | ±% |
|---|---|---|---|---|---|---|---|
| CDU | Alexander J. Herrmann | 6,131 | 37.8 | ▲19.8 | 5,171 | 31.9 | ▲16.9 |
| AfD | Maria Arlt | 3,147 | 19.4 | ▼4.2 | 3,276 | 20.2 | ▼3.4 |
| Left | ✗ Kristian Ronneburg | 2,470 | 15.2 | ▼10.0 | 2,316 | 14.3 | ▼9.6 |
| SPD | Jan Lehmann | 2,283 | 14.1 | ▼7.5 | 2,480 | 15.3 | ▼2.3 |
| Greens | Therese Stephan | 720 | 4.4 | ▼0.6 | 812 | 5.0 | ▲0.3 |
| Tierschutzpartei | Emil Friedrich | 717 | 4.4 | | 582 | 3.6 | ▲1.0 |
| FDP | Roman-Francesco Rogat | 320 | 2.0 | ▼0.9 | 417 | 2.6 | ▼0.1 |
| PARTEI | Michael Tag | 277 | 1.7 | | 202 | 1.2 | ▼0.1 |
| The Grays | | | | | 126 | 0.8 | |
| Gray Panthers | | | | | 123 | 0.8 | ▼1.3 |
| dieBasis | Thomas Lorenz | 172 | 1.1 | | 104 | 0.6 | |
| Verjüngungsforschung | | | | | 99 | 0.6 | ▼0.4 |
| Volt | | | | | 66 | 0.4 | |
| Mieterpartei | | | | | 65 | 0.4 | |
| Pirates | | | | | 60 | 0.4 | ▼1.2 |
| NPD | | | | | 56 | 0.3 | ▼1.6 |
| FW | | | | | 47 | 0.3 | |
| DKP | | | | | 47 | 0.3 | Steady |
| Bildet Berlin! | | | | | 36 | 0.2 | |
| Team Todenhöfer | | | | | 33 | 0.2 | |
| Humanists | | | | | 29 | 0.2 | |
| du. | | | | | 22 | 0.1 | |
| Klimaliste | | | | | 16 | 0.1 | |
| The Pinks/Alliance 21 | | | | | 14 | 0.1 | |
| SGP | | | | | 14 | 0.1 | |
| ÖDP | | | | | 13 | 0.1 | |
| Bergpartei, die ÜberPartei | | | | | 3 | 0.0 | |
| BüSo | | | | | 3 | 0.0 | ▼0.1 |
| LKR | | | | | 3 | 0.0 | ▼0.5 |
| Informal votes | | 178 | | | 179 | | |
| Total valid votes | | 16,237 | | | 16,235 | | |
| Turnout | | 16,429 | 53.3 | ▼4.5 | | | |
| CDU gain from Left | Majority | 2,984 | 18.4 | | | | |

=== 2021 election (annulled) ===
The election in 2021 was annulled and rerun in 2023.

State election (2021): Marzahn-Hellersdorf 6
| Notes: | Blue background denotes the winner of the electorate vote. Pink background denotes a candidate elected from their party list. Yellow background denotes an electorate win by a list member, or other incumbent. A ✓ or ✗ denotes status of any incumbent, win or lose respectively. | | | | | | |
| Party | Candidate | Votes | % | ±% | Party votes | % | ±% |
|---|---|---|---|---|---|---|---|
| CDU | Alexander J Herrmann | 5,541 | 27.9 | ▲9.9 | 4,270 | 20.9 | ▲6.0 |
| Left | ✗ Kristian Ronneburg | 3,681 | 18.6 | ▼6.7 | 3,655 | 17.9 | ▼5.9 |
| SPD | Jan Lehmann | 3,573 | 18.0 | ▼3.6 | 3,996 | 19.5 | ▲1.9 |
| AfD | Maria Arlt | 3,273 | 16.5 | ▼7.1 | 3,384 | 16.6 | ▼7.0 |
| Greens | Therese Stephan | 1,102 | 5.6 | ▲0.5 | 1,204 | 5.9 | ▲1.2 |
| Tierschutzpartei | Emil Friedrich | 1,023 | 5.2 | | 681 | 3.3 | ▲0.8 |
| FDP | Roman-Francesco Rogat | 813 | 4.1 | ▲1.3 | 1,024 | 5.0 | ▲2.4 |
| PARTEI | Michael Tag | 472 | 2.4 | | 308 | 1.5 | ▲0.2 |
| The Grays | | | | | 280 | 1.4 | |
| dieBasis | Thomas Lorenz | 365 | 1.8 | | 249 | 1.2 | |
| FW | | | | | 202 | 1.0 | |
| APT | | | | | 181 | 0.9 | |
| Gray Panthers | | | | | 174 | 0.9 | ▼1.2 |
| Verjüngungsforschung | | | | | 116 | 0.6 | ▼0.4 |
| Volt | | | | | 111 | 0.5 | |
| Pirates | | | | | 103 | 0.5 | ▼1.1 |
| NPD | | | | | 86 | 0.4 | ▼1.5 |
| Mieterpartei | | | | | 77 | 0.4 | |
| DKP | | | | | 63 | 0.3 | Steady |
| Team Todenhöfer | | | | | 63 | 0.3 | |
| Bildet Berlin! | | | | | 51 | 0.2 | |
| Humanists | | | | | 32 | 0.2 | |
| du. | | | | | 29 | 0.1 | |
| ÖDP | | | | | 23 | 0.1 | |
| Klimaliste | | | | | 17 | 0.1 | |
| The Pinks/Alliance 21 | | | | | 16 | 0.1 | |
| LKR | | | | | 13 | 0.1 | ▼0.5 |
| Bergpartei, die ÜberPartei | | | | | 12 | 0.1 | |
| BüSo | | | | | 12 | 0.1 | Steady |
| SGP | | | | | 11 | 0.1 | ▼0.1 |
| Informal votes | | 302 | | | 248 | | |
| Total valid votes | | 19,843 | | | 20,443 | | |
| Turnout | | 20,741 | 66.3 | ▲8.5 | | | |
| CDU gain from Left | Majority | 1,860 | 9.3 | | | | |

== See also ==
- Politics of Berlin
- House of Representatives of Berlin
