= Tempelhof-Schöneberg 3 =

State electoral district of Germany

- Electoral district for the Berlin House of Representatives
- Tempelhof-Schöneberg 3 in 2026
- District: Tempelhof-Schöneberg
- Electorate: 34,950 (2026)

Current electoral district
- Party: Green
- Member: Christoph Störmer

Tempelhof-Schöneberg 3 is an electoral constituency (German: Wahlkreis) represented in the House of Representatives of Berlin. It elects one member via first-past-the-post voting.

== Geography ==
The constituency comprises the district of Friedenau, the southern part of Innsbrucker Platz, and the area around Auguste Victoria Hospital, and is entirely within the borough of Tempelhof-Schöneberg.

There were 34,950 eligible voters in 2026.

== Members ==
| Election | Member | Party | % |
|---|---|---|---|
| 1990 | Harald Grieger | CDU | 41.0 |
| 1995 | Dieter Nippert | CDU | 33.5 |
| 1999 | Dieter Nippert | CDU | 39.7 |
| 2001 | Dilek Kolat | SPD | 44.6 |
| 2006 | Dilek Kolat | SPD | 42.1 |
| 2011 | Dilek Kolat | SPD | 33.7 |
| 2016 | Dilek Kolat | SPD | 31.4 |
| 2021 | Orkan Özdemir | SPD | 32.0 |
| 2023 | Orkan Özdemir | SPD | 32.0 |
| 2026 | Christoph Störmer | Green | 28.1 |

== Election results ==
=== 2026 election ===
State election (2026): Tempelhof-Schöneberg 3
| Notes: | Blue background denotes the winner of the electorate vote. Pink background denotes a candidate elected from their party list. Yellow background denotes an electorate win by a list member, or other incumbent. A ✓ or ✗ denotes status of any incumbent, win or lose respectively. | | | | | | |
| Party | Candidate | Votes | % | ±% | Party votes | % | ±% |
|---|---|---|---|---|---|---|---|
| Greens | Christoph Störmer | 7,955 | 28.1 | ▲1.3 | 7,249 | 25.6 | ▼4.5 |
| SPD | ✗ Orkan Özdemir | 7,405 | 26.2 | ▼6.0 | 4,686 | 16.5 | ▼5.4 |
| CDU | Christian Schoeler | 4,897 | 17.3 | ▼5.8 | 5,121 | 18.1 | ▼4.9 |
| Left | Christophe Immer | 4,119 | 14.5 | ▲8.4 | 6,471 | 22.8 | ▲13.7 |
| AfD | André Heinze | 1,859 | 6.6 | ▲2.9 | 2,003 | 7.1 | ▲3.1 |
| BSW | Marvin Simmons | 677 | 2.4 | | 842 | 3.0 | |
| FDP | Marcel Schwemmlein | 555 | 2.0 | ▼1.5 | 683 | 2.4 | ▼2.3 |
| Volt | Faranak Schneider | 434 | 1.5 | | 645 | 2.3 | ▲1.1 |
| Tierschutzpartei | Corinna Hägele | 415 | 1.5 | ▼0.4 | 390 | 1.4 | ▼0.3 |
| PARTEI | | | | | 136 | 0.5 | ▼0.7 |
| PdF | | | | | 55 | 0.2 | |
| ÖDP | | | | | 36 | 0.1 | Steady |
| du. | | | | | 19 | 0.1 | ▼0.1 |
| DKP | | | | | 17 | 0.1 | Steady |
| SGP | | | | | 5 | 0.0 | Steady |
| Informal votes | | 265 | | | 223 | | |
| Total valid votes | | 28,316 | | | 28,358 | | |
| Turnout | | 28,581 | 81.8 | ▲9.7 | | | |
| Greens gain from SPD | Majority | 550 | 1.9 | | | | |

=== 2023 repeat election ===
Changes denoted below for the 2023 election are compared to the 2016 election, as the 2021 election was declared invalid.

State election (2023): Tempelhof-Schöneberg 3
| Notes: | Blue background denotes the winner of the electorate vote. Pink background denotes a candidate elected from their party list. Yellow background denotes an electorate win by a list member, or other incumbent. A ✓ or ✗ denotes status of any incumbent, win or lose respectively. | | | | | | |
| Party | Candidate | Votes | % | ±% | Party votes | % | ±% |
|---|---|---|---|---|---|---|---|
| SPD | Orkan Özdemir | 7,742 | 32.1 | ▲0.8 | 5,280 | 21.9 | ▼4.4 |
| Greens | Annabelle Wolfstrum | 6,462 | 26.8 | ▼0.7 | 7,239 | 30.0 | ▲4.6 |
| CDU | Inga Frohmann | 5,551 | 23.0 | 6.4 | 5,539 | 23.0 | ▲7.3 |
| Left | Sebastian Scheel | 1,483 | 6.2 | ▼2.2 | 2,198 | 9.1 | ▼1.6 |
| AfD | Larry Rody | 881 | 3.7 | ▼4.1 | 953 | 4.0 | ▼4.0 |
| FDP | André Byrla | 829 | 3.4 | ▼3.0 | 1,126 | 4.7 | ▼2.9 |
| Tierschutzpartei | Sara Isabel Monka | 458 | 1.9 | | 398 | 1.7 | ▲0.1 |
| PARTEI | Roman Archner | 310 | 1.3 | | 282 | 1.2 | ▼0.3 |
| Volt | | | | | 273 | 1.1 | |
| dieBasis | Ugo D’Orazio | 162 | 0.7 | | 130 | 0.5 | |
| Gray Panthers | | | | | 82 | 0.3 | ▼0.4 |
| Team Todenhöfer | | | | | 82 | 0.3 | |
| Pirates | Andreas Böttcher-Hoffmeier | 91 | 0.4 | ▼1.6 | 76 | 0.3 | ▼1.2 |
| Klimaliste | | | | | 75 | 0.3 | |
| The Grays | | | | | 51 | 0.2 | |
| FW | Tobias Kuster | 83 | 0.3 | | 44 | 0.2 | |
| Humanists | | | | | 43 | 0.2 | |
| Mieterpartei | | | | | 41 | 0.2 | |
| ÖDP | Corinna Hölzer | 35 | 0.1 | | 34 | 0.1 | |
| du. | | | | | 33 | 0.1 | |
| Verjüngungsforschung | | | | | 31 | 0.1 | ▼0.1 |
| DKP | | | | | 24 | 0.1 | Steady |
| MW | | | | | 20 | 0.1 | ▼0.2 |
| Bergpartei, die ÜberPartei | | | | | 16 | 0.1 | |
| SGP | | | | | 10 | 0.0 | Steady |
| Bildet Berlin! | | | | | 8 | 0.0 | |
| BüSo | | | | | 7 | 0.0 | ▼0.1 |
| The Pinks/Alliance 21 | | | | | 6 | 0.0 | |
| NPD | | | | | 5 | 0.0 | ▼0.1 |
| LKR | | | | | 4 | 0.0 | ▼0.3 |
| Informal votes | | 24,087 | | | 24,110 | | |
| Total valid votes | | 153 | | | 127 | | |
| Turnout | | 24,268 | 72.0 | ▼3.1 | | | |
| SPD hold | Majority | 1,280 | 5.3 | | | | |

=== 2021 election (annulled) ===
The election in 2021 was annulled and rerun in 2023.

State election (2021): Tempelhof-Schöneberg 3
| Notes: | Blue background denotes the winner of the electorate vote. Pink background denotes a candidate elected from their party list. Yellow background denotes an electorate win by a list member, or other incumbent. A ✓ or ✗ denotes status of any incumbent, win or lose respectively. | | | | | | |
| Party | Candidate | Votes | % | ±% | Party votes | % | ±% |
|---|---|---|---|---|---|---|---|
| SPD | Orkan Özdemir | 8,838 | 32.1 | ▲0.7 | 6,192 | 22.4 | ▼3.9 |
| Greens | Annabelle Wolfstrum | 7,839 | 28.5 | ▲1.0 | 8,504 | 30.8 | ▲5.4 |
| CDU | Inga Frohmann | 4,410 | 16.0 | ▼0.7 | 4,240 | 15.4 | ▼0.3 |
| Left | Sebastian Scheel | 2,075 | 7.5 | ▼0.8 | 2,882 | 10.4 | ▼0.2 |
| FDP | André Byrla | 1,652 | 6.0 | ▼0.4 | 1,991 | 7.2 | ▼0.4 |
| AfD | Larry Rody | 917 | 3.3 | ▼4.4 | 979 | 3.5 | ▼4.4 |
| Tierschutzpartei | Sara Isabel Monka | 564 | 2.0 | | 442 | 1.6 | Steady |
| Volt | | | | | 422 | 1.5 | |
| dieBasis | Ugo D’Orazio | 410 | 1.5 | | 352 | 1.3 | |
| PARTEI | Roman Archner | 390 | 1.4 | | 384 | 1.4 | ▼0.1 |
| Team Todenhöfer | | | | | 214 | 0.8 | |
| FW | Tobias Kuster | 237 | 0.9 | | 156 | 0.6 | |
| Klimaliste | | | | | 153 | 0.6 | |
| Gray Panthers | | | | | 117 | 0.4 | ▼0.3 |
| Pirates | Andreas Böttcher-Hoffmeier | 143 | 0.5 | ▼1.5 | 94 | 0.3 | ▼1.1 |
| The Grays | | | | | 92 | 0.3 | |
| APT | | | | | 66 | 0.2 | |
| Humanists | | | | | 55 | 0.2 | |
| du. | | | | | 45 | 0.2 | |
| ÖDP | Corinna Hölzer | 70 | 0.3 | | 43 | 0.2 | |
| Mieterpartei | | | | | 37 | 0.1 | |
| Bildet Berlin! | | | | | 34 | 0.1 | |
| MW | | | | | 29 | 0.1 | ▼0.1 |
| Verjüngungsforschung | | | | | 23 | 0.1 | ▼0.2 |
| DKP | | | | | 19 | 0.1 | ▼0.1 |
| LKR | | | | | 15 | 0.1 | ▼0.2 |
| Bergpartei, die ÜberPartei | | | | | 11 | 0.0 | |
| The Pinks/Alliance 21 | | | | | 8 | 0.0 | |
| NPD | | | | | 7 | 0.0 | Steady |
| SGP | | | | | 4 | 0.0 | ▼0.1 |
| BüSo | | | | | 3 | 0.0 | ▼0.1 |
| Informal votes | | 245 | | | 210 | | |
| Total valid votes | | 27,545 | | | 27,613 | | |
| Turnout | | 27,855 | 83.4 | ▲8.2 | | | |
| SPD hold | Majority | 999 | 3.6 | | | | |

== See also ==
- Politics of Berlin
- House of Representatives of Berlin
