= Pankow 3 =

State electoral district of Germany

- Electoral district for the Berlin House of Representatives
- Pankow 3 in 2026
- District: Pankow
- Electorate: 35,116 (2026)

Current electoral district
- Party: The Left
- Member: Christian Zebisch

Pankow 3 is an electoral constituency (German: Wahlkreis) represented in the House of Representatives of Berlin. It elects one member via first-past-the-post voting.

== Geography ==
The constituency comprises the north of Pankow, the west of Französisch Buchholz, and the southern part of Niderschönhausen within the borough of Pankow.

There were 35,116 eligible voters in 2026.

== Members ==
Election	Member	Party	%
2006	Torsten Schneider	SPD	31.9
2011	Torsten Schneider	SPD	30.8
2016	Torsten Schneider	SPD	24.8
2021	Oda Hassepaß	Green	23.8
2023	Oda Hassepaß	Green	24.7
2026	Christian Zebisch	Left	26.0

== Election results ==
=== 2026 election ===
State election (2026): Pankow 3
Notes:	Blue background denotes the winner of the electorate vote. Pink background denotes a candidate elected from their party list. Yellow background denotes an electorate win by a list member, or other incumbent. A ✓ or ✗ denotes status of any incumbent, win or lose respectively.						
Party	Candidate	Votes	%	±%	Party votes	%	±%
Left	Christian Zebisch	7,232	26.0	▲4.6	8,017	28.7	▲12.1
Greens	✗ Oda Hassepaß	7,069	25.5	▲0.7	5,294	19.0	▼4.0
AfD	Hanno Bachmann	3,991	14.4	▲4.9	4,032	14.5	▲5.2
CDU	Antje Tölle	3,600	13.0	▼6.7	3,760	13.5	▼6.8
SPD	Paul Krüger	3,038	10.9	▼4.2	3,141	11.3	▼5.8
BSW	Kathrin Radke	1,313	4.7		1,350	4.8	
Volt	Udo Zadow	661	2.4		710	2.5	▲1.4
FDP	Maria Wandel	565	2.0	▼0.8	582	2.1	▼1.3
APT					554	2.0	▼0.3
Independent	Oliver Snelinski	300	1.1				
PARTEI					223	0.8	▼1.0
PdF					107	0.4	
ÖDP					54	0.2	Steady
DKP					46	0.2	▼0.1
du.					24	0.1	▼0.1
SGP					8	0.0	Steady
Informal votes		373			240		
Total valid votes		27,769			27,902		
Turnout		28,142	80.1	▲10.7			
Left gain from Greens	Majority	163	0.5				

=== 2023 repeat election ===
Changes denoted below for the 2023 election are compared to the 2016 election, as the 2021 election was declared invalid.

State election (2023): Pankow 3
Notes:	Blue background denotes the winner of the electorate vote. Pink background denotes a candidate elected from their party list. Yellow background denotes an electorate win by a list member, or other incumbent. A ✓ or ✗ denotes status of any incumbent, win or lose respectively.						
Party	Candidate	Votes	%	±%	Party votes	%	±%
Greens	Oda Hassepaß	5,628	24.8	▲7.1	5,239	23.0	▲5.4
Left	Klaus Lederer	4,880	21.5	▼1.1	3,787	16.6	▼6.5
CDU	Norman Gutschow	4,479	19.7	▲8.0	4,615	20.3	▲7.9
SPD	✗ Torsten Schneider	3,434	15.1	▼9.7	3,884	17.1	▼4.5
AfD	Hanno Bachmann	2,142	9.4	▼3.9	2,095	9.2	▼3.8
FDP	Maria Wandel	653	2.9	▼0.3	775	3.4	▼0.1
APT	Antje Naumburger	621	2.7		527	2.3	▲0.8
PARTEI	Barbara Marie Scheiber	465	2.0	▲0.1	414	1.8	▼0.2
Volt					264	1.2	
dieBasis					212	0.9	
Mieterpartei	Steffen Doebert	276	1.2	▼0.3	141	0.6	
The Grays					95	0.4	
Gray Panthers					87	0.4	▼0.6
FW	Ilja Schaärsky-von Brünken	148	0.7		73	0.3	
Pirates					73	0.3	▼1.6
DKP					69	0.3	▼0.2
Verjüngungsforschung					62	0.3	▼0.4
Klimaliste					56	0.2	
Humanists					46	0.2	
Bildet Berlin!					44	0.2	
Team Todenhöfer					44	0.2	
du.					39	0.2	
ÖDP					38	0.2	
NPD					28	0.1	▼0.3
SGP					17	0.1	▼0.1
Bergpartei, die ÜberPartei					16	0.1	
The Pinks/Alliance 21					13	0.1	
BüSo					8	0.0	▼0.1
LKR					4	0.0	▼0.3
Informal votes		189			149		
Total valid votes		22,726			22,765		
Turnout		22,927	69.4	▼1.7			
Greens gain from SPD	Majority	748	3.3				

=== 2021 election (annulled) ===
The election in 2021 was annulled and rerun in 2023.

State election (2021): Pankow 3
Notes:	Blue background denotes the winner of the electorate vote. Pink background denotes a candidate elected from their party list. Yellow background denotes an electorate win by a list member, or other incumbent. A ✓ or ✗ denotes status of any incumbent, win or lose respectively.						
Party	Candidate	Votes	%	±%	Party votes	%	±%
Greens	Oda Hassepaß	6,190	23.8	▲6.1	6,150	23.5	▲5.9
Left	Klaus Lederer	6,166	23.7	▲1.2	5,038	19.3	▼3.9
SPD	✗ Torsten Schneider	4,968	19.1	▼5.7	5,035	19.3	▼2.3
CDU	Norman Gutschow	3,036	11.7	Steady	3,100	11.9	▼0.5
AfD	Hanno Bachmann	2,071	8.0	▼5.4	1,964	7.5	▼5.5
FDP	Maria Wandel	1,374	5.3	▲2.1	1,475	5.6	▲2.2
Tierschutzpartei	Antje Naumburger	810	3.1		521	2.0	▲0.5
PARTEI	Barbara Marie Scheiber	656	2.5	▲0.6	558	2.1	▲0.2
dieBasis					440	1.7	
Volt					306	1.2	
The Grays					263	1.0	
FW	Ilja Schaärsky-von Brünken	443	1.7		228	0.9	
Klimaliste					118	0.5	
Mieterpartei	Steffen Doebert	287	1.1		116	0.4	
Pirates					111	0.4	▼1.5
APT					106	0.4	
Verjüngungsforschung					99	0.4	▼0.3
Gray Panthers					91	0.3	▼0.6
Team Todenhöfer					89	0.3	
DKP					59	0.2	▼0.2
du.					47	0.2	
Humanists					47	0.2	
ÖDP					41	0.2	
Bildet Berlin!					40	0.2	
NPD					22	0.1	▼0.3
Bergpartei, die ÜberPartei					21	0.1	
BüSo					10	0.0	▼0.1
The Pinks/Alliance 21					10	0.0	
LKR					9	0.0	▼0.3
SGP					5	0.0	▼0.1
Informal votes		299			174		
Total valid votes		26,001			26,119		
Turnout		26,329	79.5	▲8.4			
Greens gain from SPD	Majority	24	0.1				

== See also ==
- Politics of Berlin
- House of Representatives of Berlin
