= Charlottenburg-Wilmersdorf 2 =

State electoral district of Germany

- Electoral district for the Berlin House of Representatives
- Charlottenburg-Wilmersdorf 2 in 2026
- District: Charlottenburg-Wilmersdorf
- Electorate: 31,122 (2026)

Current electoral district
- Party: CDU
- Member: Arturel Hack

Charlottenburg-Wilmersdorf 2 is an electoral constituency (German: Wahlkreis) represented in the House of Representatives of Berlin. It elects one member via first-past-the-post voting.

== Geography ==
The constituency comprises the Westend district of Berlin, and the areas of Klausenerplatz and Charlottenburg, within the borough of Charlottenburg-Wilmersdorf.

There were 31,122 eligible voters in 2026.

== Members ==
Election	Member	Party	%
1995	Ingo Schmitt	CDU	40.3
1999	Klaus-Rüdiger Landowsky	CDU	58.9
2001	Axel Rabbach	CDU	36.4
2006	Andreas Statzkowski	CDU	37.3
2011	Andreas Statzkowski	CDU	39.9
2016	Andreas Statzkowski	CDU	28.6
2021	Arturel Hack	CDU	28.9
2023	Arturel Hack	CDU	38.7
2026	Arturel Hack	CDU	33.1

== Election results ==
=== 2026 election ===
State election (2026): Charlottenburg-Wilmersdorf 2
Notes:	Blue background denotes the winner of the electorate vote. Pink background denotes a candidate elected from their party list. Yellow background denotes an electorate win by a list member, or other incumbent. A ✓ or ✗ denotes status of any incumbent, win or lose respectively.						
Party	Candidate	Votes	%	±%	Party votes	%	±%
CDU	✓ Ariturel Hack	7,859	33.1	▼5.6	7,327	30.7	▼4.8
Greens	Corinna Balkow	4,484	18.9	▼1.2	3,860	16.2	▼2.3
SPD	Clemens Wilhelm Brandt	3,525	14.8	▼5.7	3,556	14.9	▼5.7
Left	Enrico Brehm	3,380	14.2	▲9.6	3,821	16.0	▲10.4
AfD	Hugh Bronson	2,267	9.5	▲4.4	2,348	9.8	▲4.5
FDP	Fabian Pfeil	993	4.2	▼1.8	1,067	4.5	▼3.6
BSW	Norbert Lasert	663	2.8		740	3.1	
Volt	Victoria Borrell-Alvarez	573	2.4		564	2.4	▲1.5
Tierschutzpartei					360	1.5	▼0.2
PARTEI					113	0.5	▼0.6
PdF					50	0.2	
ÖDP					30	0.1	Steady
du.					20	0.1	Steady
DKP					10	0.0	Steady
SGP					3	0.0	Steady
Informal votes		367			242		
Total valid votes		23,744			23,869		
Turnout		24,111	77.5	▲9.0			
CDU hold	Majority	3,475	14.2	▼3.9			

=== 2023 repeat election ===
Changes denoted below for the 2023 election are compared to the 2016 election, as the 2021 election was declared invalid.

State election (2023): Charlottenburg-Wilmersdorf 2
Notes:	Blue background denotes the winner of the electorate vote. Pink background denotes a candidate elected from their party list. Yellow background denotes an electorate win by a list member, or other incumbent. A ✓ or ✗ denotes status of any incumbent, win or lose respectively.						
Party	Candidate	Votes	%	±%	Party votes	%	±%
CDU	Arturel Hack	8,088	38.7	▲10.1	7,431	35.5	▲11.1
SPD	Alexander Sempf	4,297	20.6	▼5.1	4,315	20.6	▼1.6
Greens	Jun Chen	4,209	20.1	▲4.2	3,859	18.4	▲3.0
FDP	Fabian Marcel Pfeil	1,256	6.0	▼5.1	1,681	8.0	▼6.1
AfD	Hugh Theodore Bronson	1,070	5.1	▼5.3	1,124	5.4	▼5.4
Left	Frederike-Sophie Gronde-Brunner	977	4.7	▼1.7	1,177	5.6	▼1.5
Tierschutzpartei	Christian Kreczynski	410	2.0		348	1.7	Steady
PARTEI	Yvonne Hoffmann	384	1.8		234	1.1	▲0.1
Volt					180	0.9	
dieBasis	Carolin Linge	123	0.6		101	0.5	
Gray Panthers					63	0.3	▼0.3
Pirates					62	0.3	▼0.8
Team Todenhöfer					53	0.3	
The Grays					42	0.2	
Verjüngungsforschung					32	0.2	▼0.1
Klimaliste					32	0.2	
FW	Stefan Grüll	72	0.3		31	0.1	
Humanists					28	0.1	
Mieterpartei					25	0.1	
ÖDP					20	0.1	
du.					19	0.1	
New Democrats					14	0.1	
DKP					10	0.0	Steady
Bildet Berlin!					10	0.0	
LKR	Felicitas Schirow	19	0.1		9	0.0	▼0.5
Bergpartei, die ÜberPartei					9	0.0	
SGP					8	0.0	Steady
NPD					7	0.0	▼0.1
German Conservative					2	0.0	
The Pinks/Alliance 21					2	0.0	
BüSo					1	0.0	▼0.1
Informal votes		133			109		
Total valid votes		20,905			20,929		
Turnout		21,057	68.5	▼4.5			
CDU hold	Majority	3,781	18.1				

=== 2021 election (annulled) ===
The election in 2021 was annulled and rerun in 2023.

State election (2021): Charlottenburg-Wilmersdorf 2
Notes:	Blue background denotes the winner of the electorate vote. Pink background denotes a candidate elected from their party list. Yellow background denotes an electorate win by a list member, or other incumbent. A ✓ or ✗ denotes status of any incumbent, win or lose respectively.						
Party	Candidate	Votes	%	±%	Party votes	%	±%
CDU	Arturel Hack	7,007	28.9	▲0.3	6,290	25.8	▲1.4
SPD	Alexander Sempf	5,628	23.2	▼2.5	5,536	22.7	▲0.5
Greens	Jun Chen	5,144	21.2	▲5.3	4,809	19.7	▲4.3
FDP	Fabian Marcel Pfeil	2,317	9.5	▼1.6	2,795	11.5	▼2.6
Left	Frederike-Sophie Gronde-Brunner	1,361	5.6	▼0.8	1,652	6.8	▼0.4
AfD	Hugh Theodore Bronson	1,162	4.8	▼5.6	1,182	4.9	▼6.0
PARTEI	Yvonne Hoffmann	573	2.4		321	1.3	▲0.3
Tierschutzpartei	Christian Kreczynski	493	2.0		358	1.5	▼0.1
dieBasis	Carolin Linge	340	1.4		265	1.1	
Volt					254	1.0	
Team Todenhöfer					154	0.6	
FW	Stefan Grüll	222	0.9		151	0.6	
Pirates					77	0.3	▼0.8
APT					73	0.3	
The Grays					71	0.3	
Gray Panthers					60	0.2	▼0.4
Klimaliste					56	0.2	
Humanists					50	0.2	
Mieterpartei					36	0.1	
Verjüngungsforschung					33	0.1	▼0.1
ÖDP					23	0.1	
du.					17	0.1	
Bildet Berlin!					15	0.1	
LKR	Felicitas Schirow	17	0.1		14	0.1	▼0.5
New Democrats					14	0.1	
NPD					13	0.1	▼0.1
BüSo					11	0.0	Steady
Bergpartei, die ÜberPartei					8	0.0	
DKP					8	0.0	Steady
The Pinks/Alliance 21					4	0.0	
SGP					3	0.0	Steady
German Conservative					1	0.0	
Informal votes		720			226		
Total valid votes		24,264			24,354		
Turnout		25,062	81.7	▲8.8			
CDU hold	Majority	1,379	5.7				

== See also ==
- Politics of Berlin
- House of Representatives of Berlin
