= Vandrey =

Vandrey is a surname. Notable people with the surname include:

- Jan Vandrey (born1991), German sprint canoeist
- Petra Vandrey (born 1965), German lawyer and politician

== See also ==
- Van Drew
