= Oda Hassepaß =

German politician, born 1974

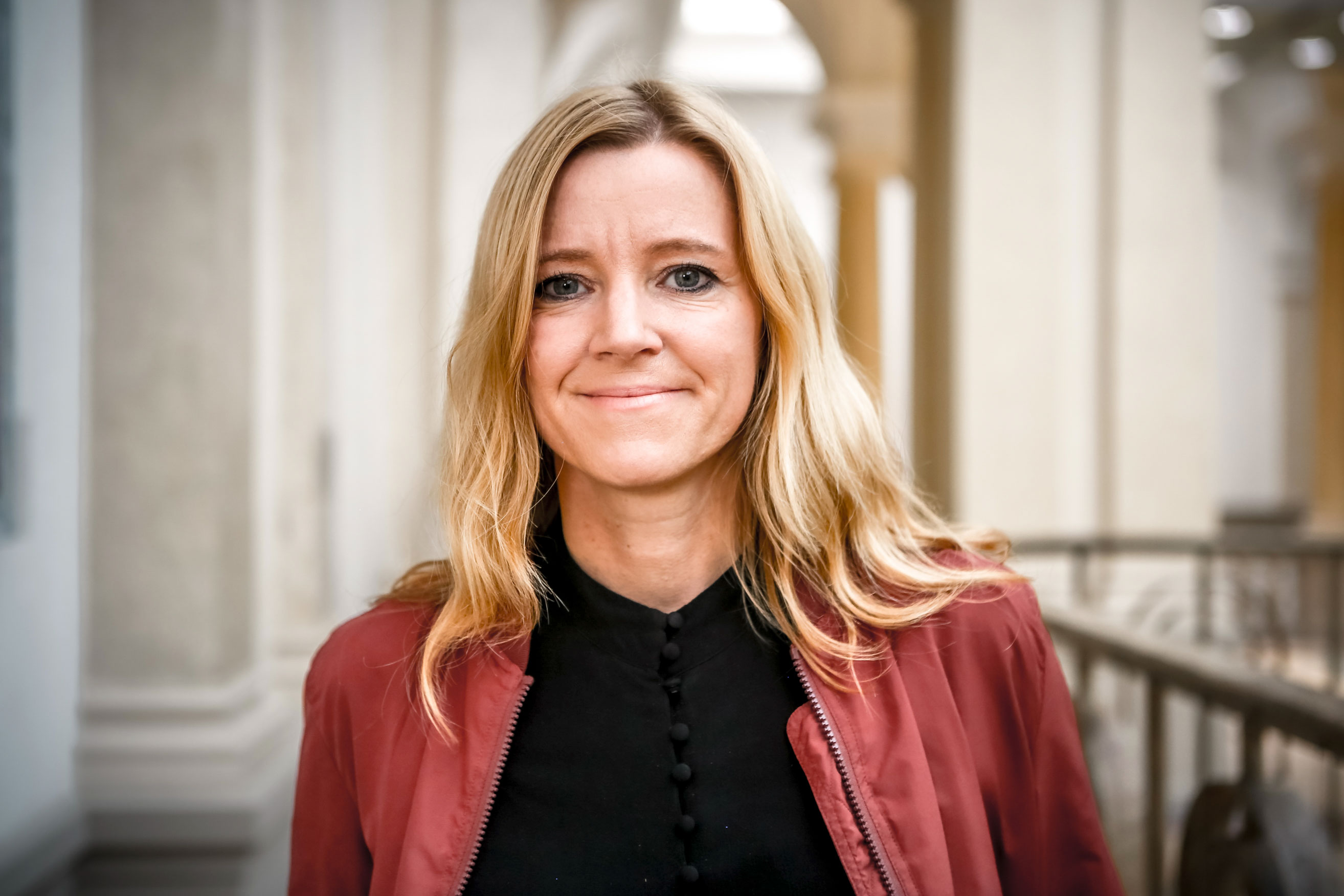
- Oda Hassepaß in 2021

Member of the Berlin House of Representatives
- Incumbent
- Assumed office 26 September 2021

Personal details
- Born: Oda Hassepaß; 1974 (age 51–52) Hamburg, Germany
- Party: Alliance 90/The Greens
- Website: www.oda-hassepass.de

Oda Hassepaß (born 1974) is a German politician from the Alliance 90/The Greens. She has been a member of the Berlin House of Representatives since 2021.

== Biography ==
=== Education and early career ===
Oda Hassepaß was born in Hamburg in 1974 and grew up in the southern part of the city. After completing her schooling, she studied economics at the Carl von Ossietzky University of Oldenburg from 1995 to 1999, graduating with a degree in economics. She has lived in Berlin since 2000. She has worked for various media companies, including Media1, Cultfish Entertainment (2000 to 2006), and Egmont Ehapa Verlag (2006 to 2011). Since 2010, Hassepaß has been a consultant for a family-owned furniture manufacturing company that she co-founded. She also worked in sales for the weekly newspaper Der Freitag in 2012, where she headed the customer communications department.

=== Political career ===
Hassepaß is a member of the Green Party (Alliance 90/The Greens). Since 2021, Oda Hassepaß has been the Green Party's spokesperson for transport policy in the Berlin House of Representatives, where she is a member of both the Committee on Mobility and the Main Committee. She is also a co-organizer of the feminist mobility conference "Women Make Mobility".

In 2021 the Pankow district branch of the Green Party nominated her as their direct candidate for the 2021 Berlin state election in the Pankow 3 constituency. In the election, Hassepaß won the direct mandate with 23.8 percent of the first-preference votes. She prevailed by just 24 votes against Klaus Lederer, the top candidate for Die Linke in Berlin, who also ran in the constituency. In the 2023 Berlin state election, she was able to defend her seat in the House of Representatives and won the constituency with 24.8 percent of the first-preference votes. In 2024, she organized the first Green road safety conference in the Berlin House of Representatives on the topic of #safeontheroad, focusing on Vision Zero, safe routes to school, and 30 km/h speed limits. In November 2025, Oda Hassepaß was again nominated by the Pankow district association as the direct candidate in constituency 3 to run for the Greens in the Berlin elections on 20 September 2026.
