= Ariturel Hack =

German politician (born 1989)

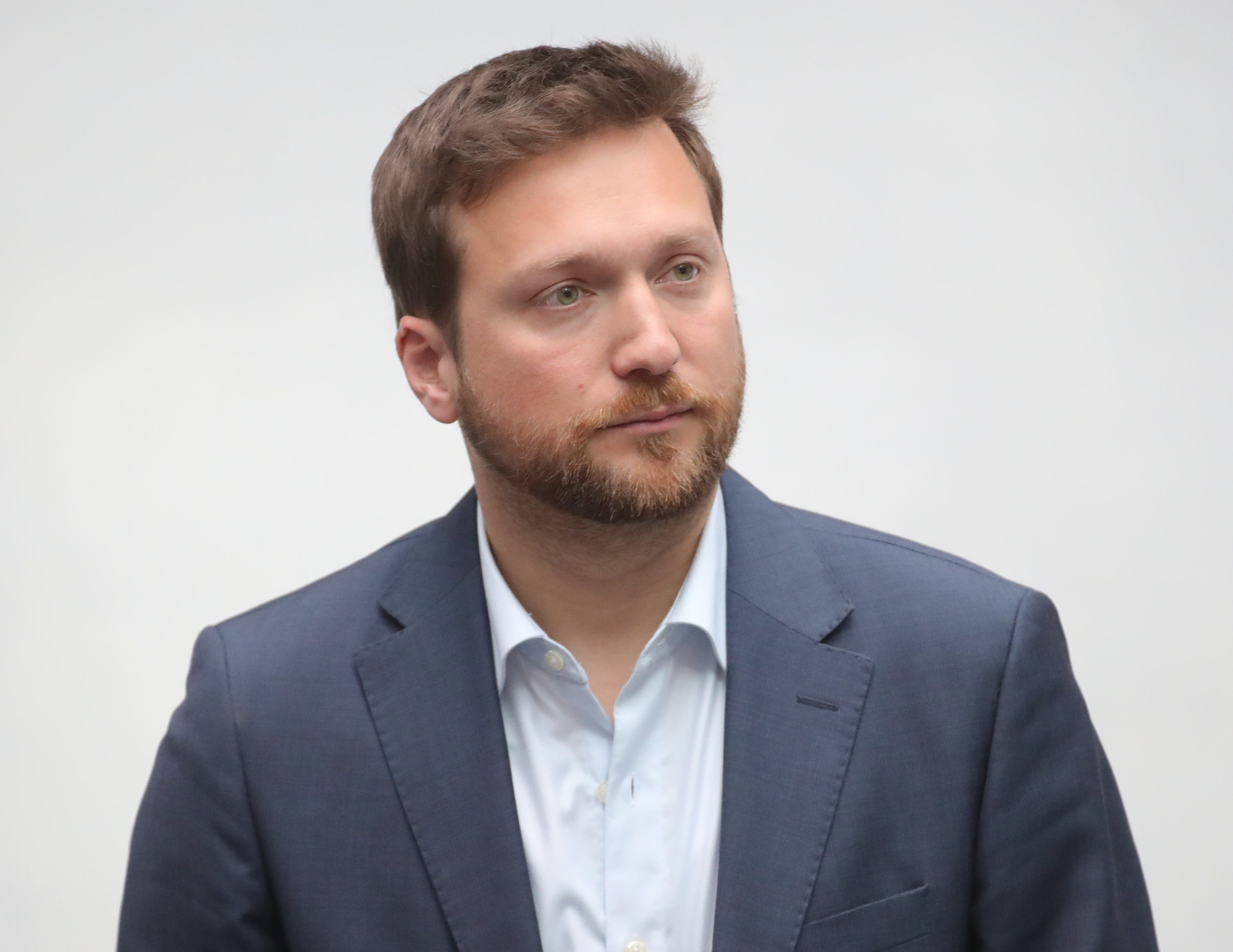
- Hack in 2023

Member of the Berlin House of Representatives
- Incumbent
- Assumed office 4 November 2021
- Preceded by: Andreas Statzkowski
- Constituency: Charlottenburg-Wilmersdorf 2

Personal details
- Born: 1989 (age 36–37)
- Party: Christian Democratic Union (since 2008)

Ariturel Hack (born 1989) is a German politician serving as a member of the Berlin House of Representatives since 2021. From 2019 to 2021, he was a borough councillor of Charlottenburg-Wilmersdorf.
