= Alexander J. Herrmann =

German politician (born 1975)

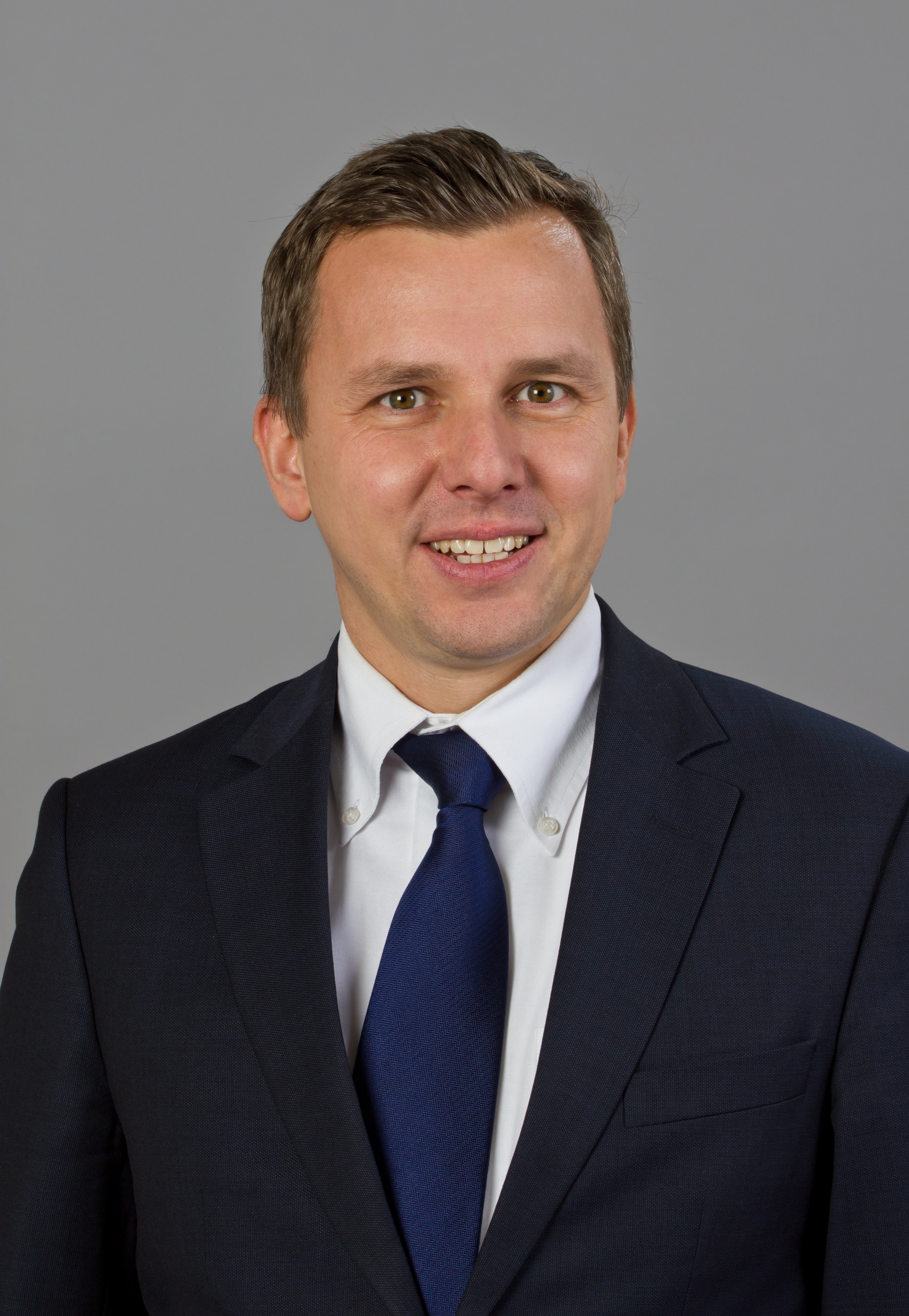
- Herrmann in 2013

Member of the Abgeordnetenhaus of Berlin
- Incumbent
- Assumed office 4 November 2021
- Preceded by: Kristian Ronneburg
- Constituency: Marzahn-Hellersdorf 6
- In office 4 November 2011 – 27 October 2016
- Constituency: Marzahn-Hellersdorf

Personal details
- Born: 20 December 1975 (age 50) Berlin
- Party: Christian Democratic Union (since 2008)

Alexander Jon Herrmann (born 20 December 1975 in Berlin) is a German politician. He has been a member of the Abgeordnetenhaus of Berlin since 2021, having previously served from 2011 to 2016. From October to November 2011, he was a borough councillor of Marzahn-Hellersdorf.
