= Orkan Özdemir =

German politician (born 1982)

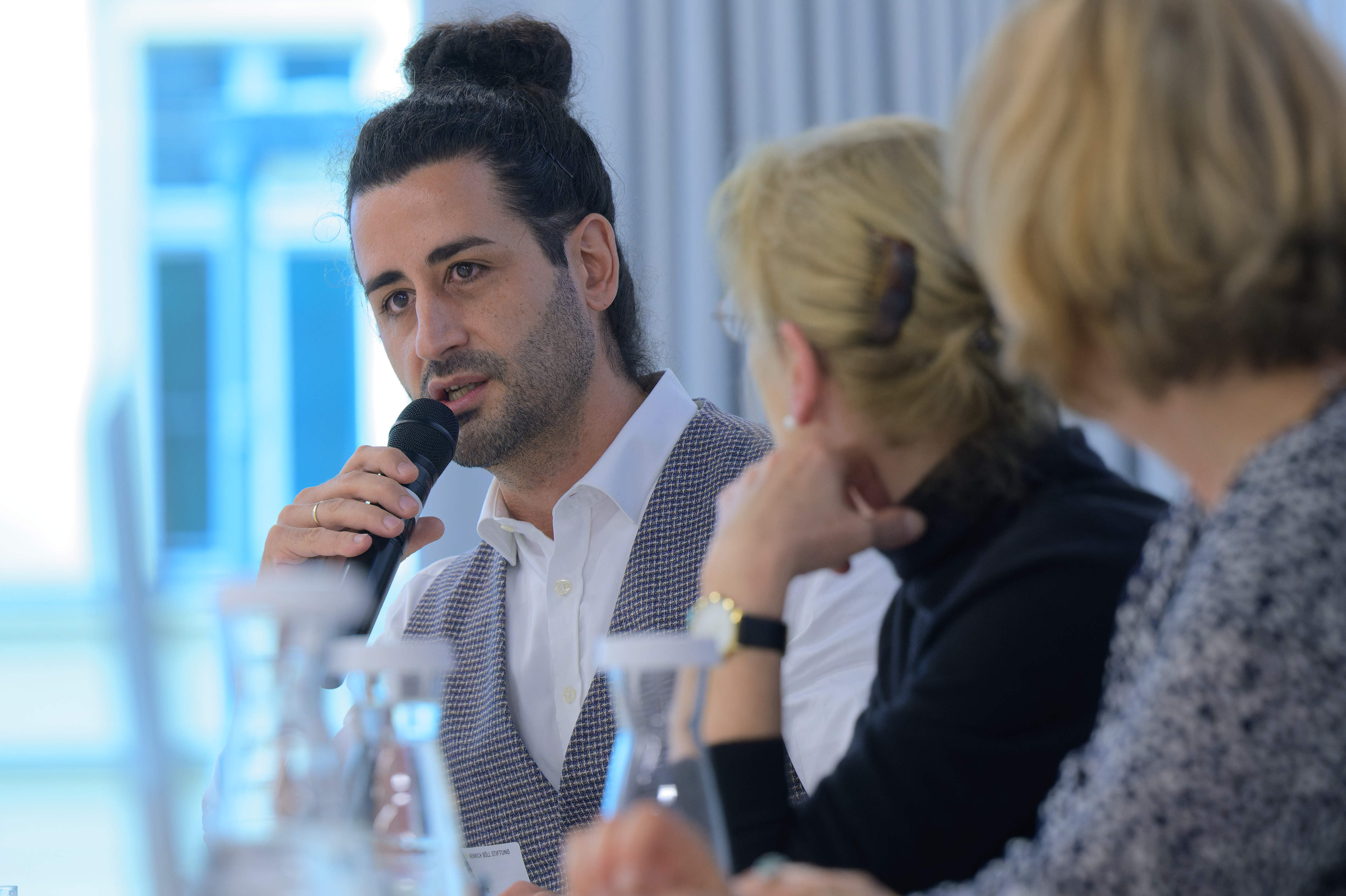
- Özdemir in 2023

Member of the Berlin House of Representatives
- Incumbent
- Assumed office 4 November 2021
- Preceded by: Dilek Kalayci
- Constituency: Tempelhof-Schöneberg 3

Personal details
- Born: 1982 (age 43–44)
- Party: Social Democratic Party (since 2009)

Orkan Özdemir (born 1982) is a German politician serving as a member of the Berlin House of Representatives since 2021. From 2012 to 2021, he was a borough councillor of Tempelhof-Schöneberg.
