= Danny Freymark =

German politician (born 1983)

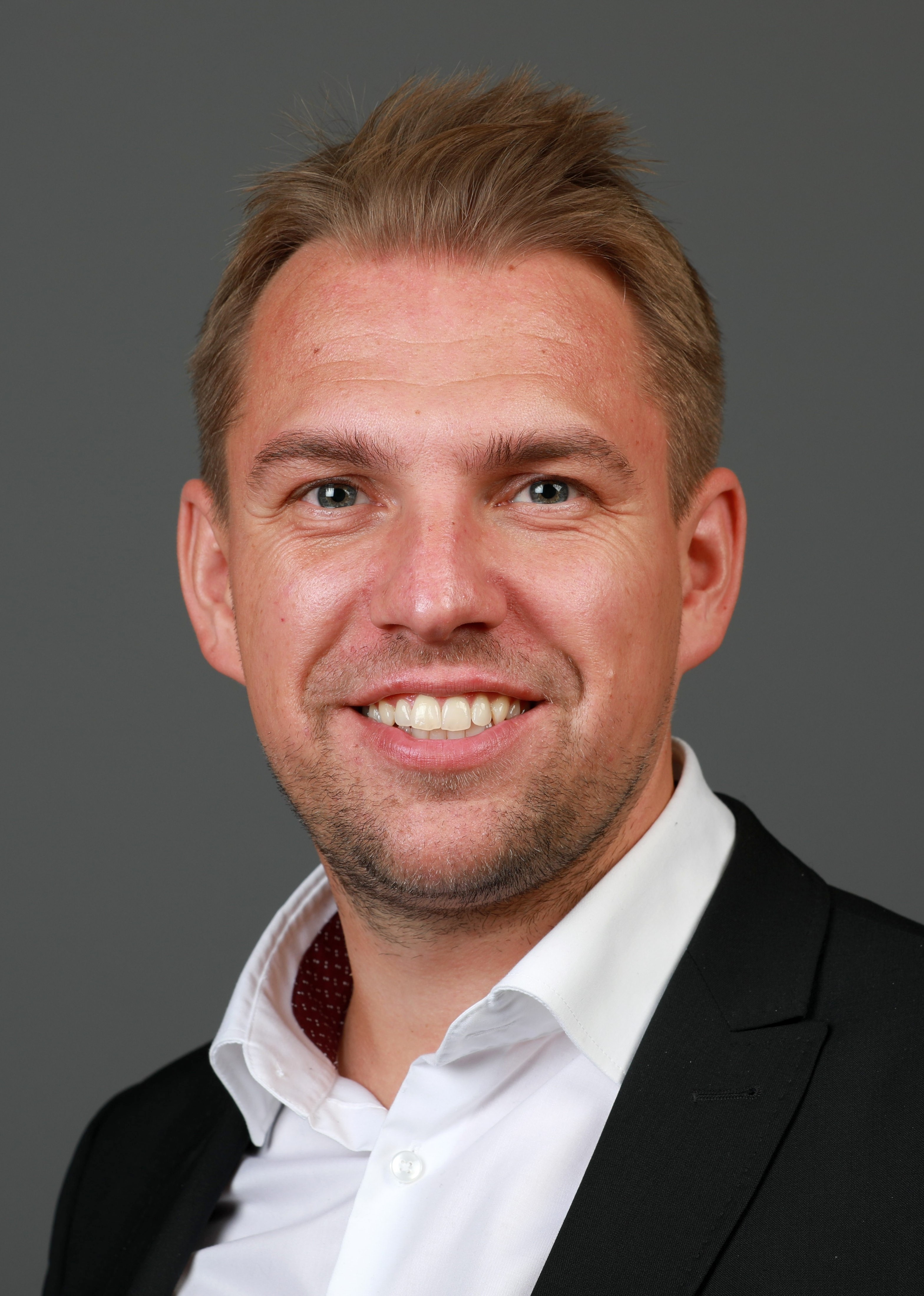
- Freymark in 2017

Member of the Abgeordnetenhaus of Berlin
- Incumbent
- Assumed office 27 October 2011
- Constituency: Lichtenberg

Personal details
- Born: 9 April 1983 (age 43) Berlin
- Party: Christian Democratic Union

Danny Freymark (born 9 April 1983 in Berlin) is a German politician serving as a member of the Abgeordnetenhaus of Berlin since 2011. He has served as deputy group leader of the Christian Democratic Union since 2021. From 2016 to 2021, he served as chief whip of the Christian Democratic Union.
