= Maik Penn =

German politician (born 1981)

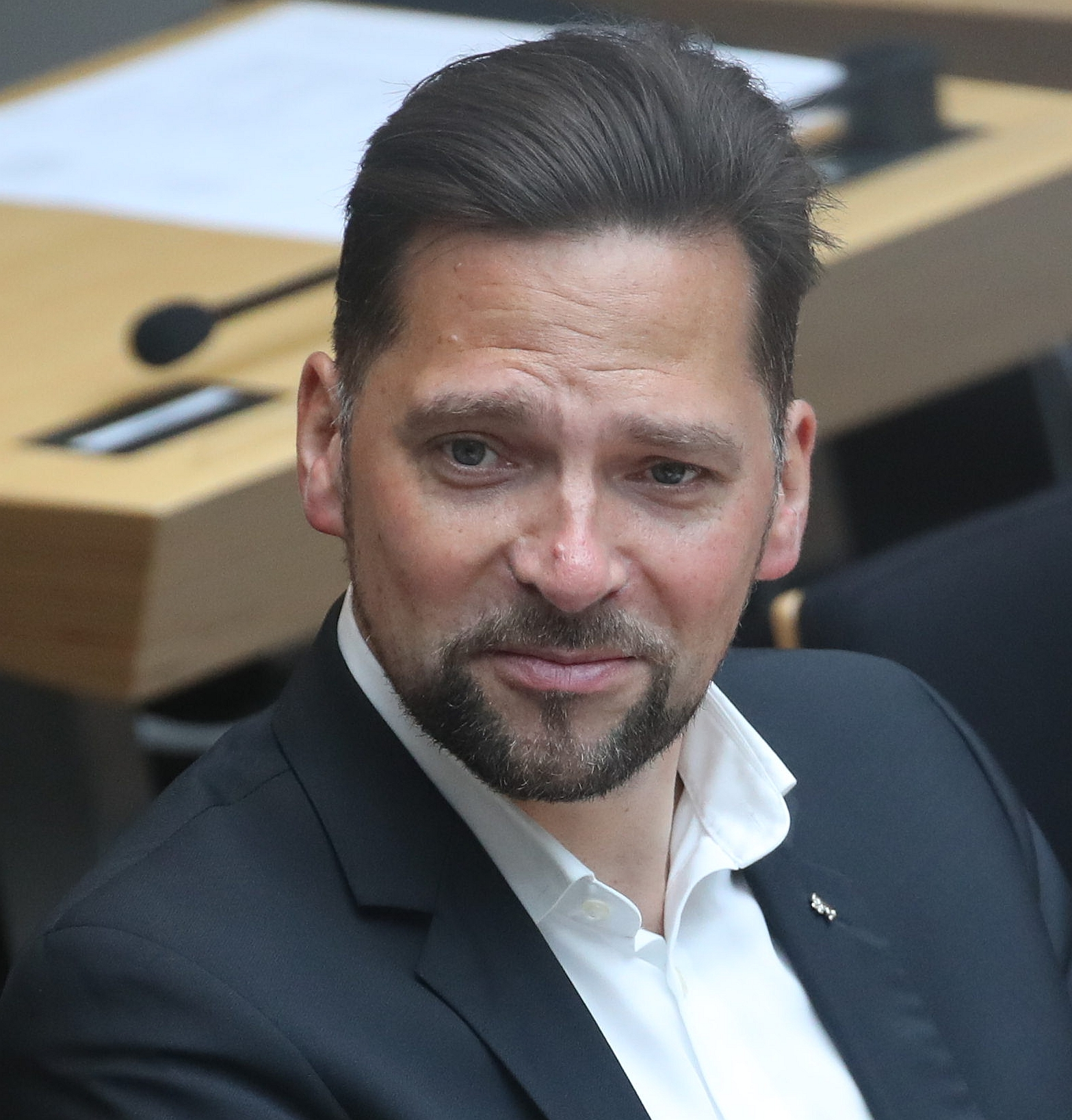
- Penn in 2025

Member of the Abgeordnetenhaus of Berlin
- Incumbent
- Assumed office 27 October 2016

Personal details
- Born: 19 March 1981 (age 45)
- Party: Christian Democratic Union (since 1997)

Maik Penn (born 19 March 1981) is a German politician serving as a member of the Abgeordnetenhaus of Berlin since 2016. He has served as chairman of the Christian Democratic Union in Treptow-Köpenick since 2017.
