= Petra Vandrey =

German lawyer and politician

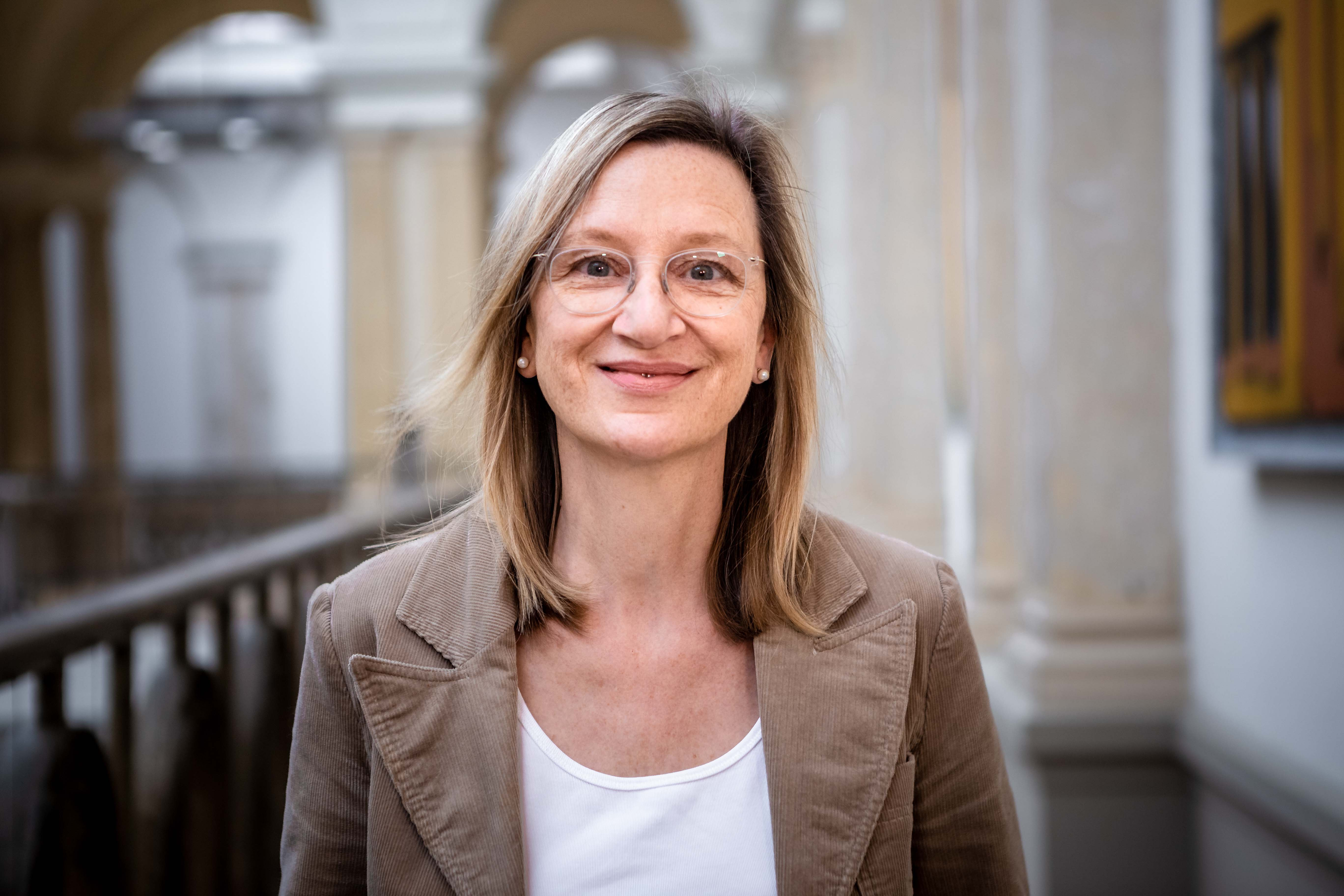
- Petra Vandrey in 2021

Member of the Abgeordnetenhaus of Berlin
- Incumbent
- Assumed office 2019

Personal details
- Born: 1965 (age 60–61) Berlin
- Party: Alliance 90/The Greens
- Education: Free University of Berlin
- Website: petra-vandrey.de

Petra Vandrey (born 1965) is a German lawyer and politician from the Alliance 90/The Greens. She has been a member of the Abgeordnetenhaus of Berlin since 2019.

Petra Vandrey studied law at the Free University of Berlin, receiving her doctorate in 1994 with a thesis on "Reconstructing Environmental Law? An Investigation of the Advantages and Disadvantages of Codifying Environmental Law, Considering Relevant Experiences Abroad." She was admitted to the bar in 1997 and is a specialist in family law.

Vandrey is a member of Alliance 90/The Greens. She held a seat in the Charlottenburg-Wilmersdorf district council until 31 July 2019, temporarily as parliamentary group leader. In 2021, Vandrey won a direct mandate for the Abgeordnetenhaus. She was able to defend her seat in the 2023 Berlin state election.
