= Laura Neugebauer =

German politician (born 1995)

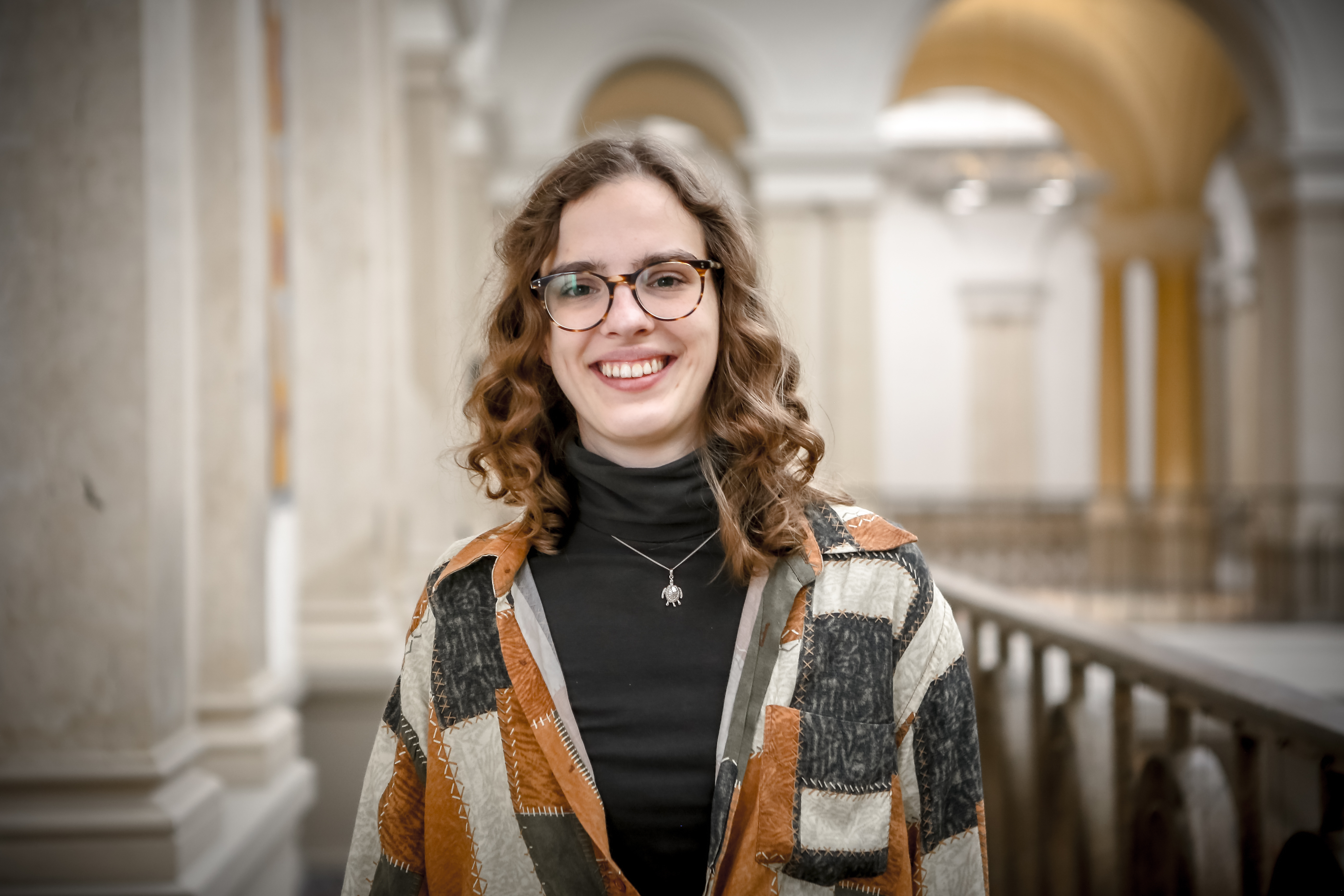
- Neugebauer in 2021

Member of the Abgeordnetenhaus of Berlin
- Incumbent
- Assumed office 4 November 2021

Personal details
- Born: Laura Neugebauer; 1995 (age 30–31) Berlin, Germany
- Party: Alliance 90/The Greens
- Education: Technische Universität Berlin

Laura Neugebauer (born 1995) is a German politician of Alliance 90/The Greens who is serving as a member of the Abgeordnetenhaus of Berlin since 2021.

== Life and education ==
Neugebauer was born in Berlin in 1995. She completed her secondary education at the Mosaik-Gymnasium Oberhavel in Oranienburg. After graduating in 2014, she performed a year in the federal volunteers service on the public relations team at Berlin Aids-Hilfe. She then began training as an event manager at Berlin's Oberstufenzentrum Handel I, which she completed in 2018. At the same time, she worked as an assistant at the communications and event agency Rubis Development Group. Since 2018, Neugebauer has been studying industrial engineering with a focus on energy and resources at Technische Universität Berlin.

== Politics ==
Neugebauer has been involved with the Greens for several years. In 2016, she was elected to the district council of the Mitte neighbourhood. In December 2017 she became speaker of the Greens faction there and spokeswoman for education, culture and climate. Since 2019, she is a deputy delegate of the Green federal delegates conference.

In 2021, Neugebauer was nominated as Greens candidate in the Mitte 7 constituency for the 2021 Berlin state election and 29th place on the state party list. She named education and decolonisation as her political priorities. She was elected to the Abgeordnetenhaus in Mitte 7, winning with 28.1% of votes. She became Greens spokeswoman for universities, research and extracirricular education as well as for queer politics. In January 2022, she became chair of the Committee for Culture and Europe.
