= Martin Pätzold =

German politician (born 1984)

- Pätzold in 2026

Member of the Bundestag
- In office 22 October 2013 – 24 October 2017
- Constituency: Berlin

Personal details
- Born: 6 September 1984 (age 42) Moscow, Russian SFSR
- Party: Christian Democratic Union (since 2002)

Martin Pätzold (born 6 September 1984 in Moscow) is a Soviet-born German politician serving as a member of the Abgeordnetenhaus of Berlin since 2021. From 2013 to 2017, he was a member of the Bundestag.
