= André Schulze (politician) =

German politician (born 1987)

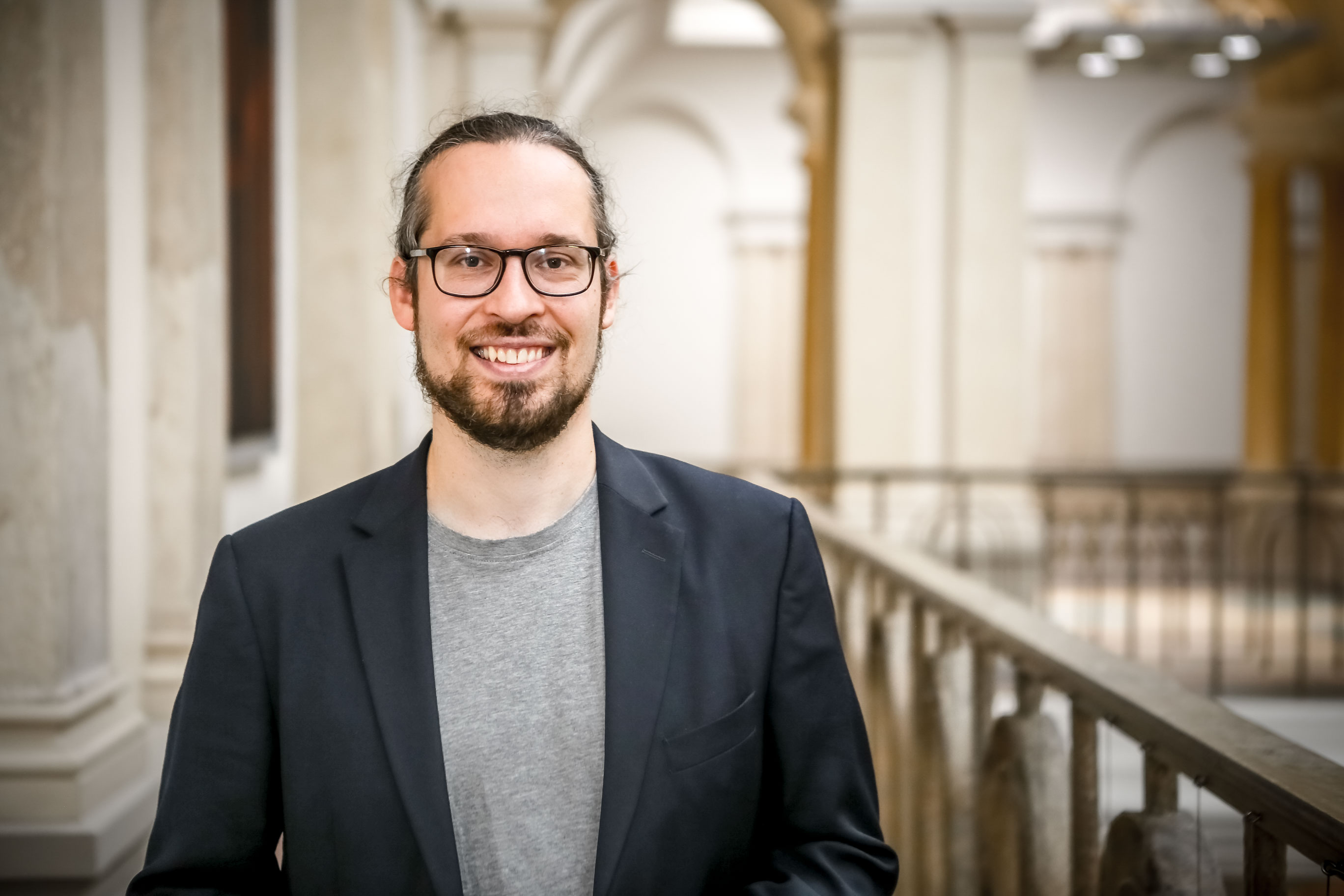
- Schulze in 2021

Member of the Berlin House of Representatives
- Incumbent
- Assumed office 4 November 2021
- Preceded by: Anja Kofbinger
- Constituency: Neukölln 1

Personal details
- Born: 1987 (age 38–39)
- Party: Alliance 90/The Greens (since 2009)

André Schulze (born 1987) is a German politician serving as a member of the Berlin House of Representatives since 2021. From 2019 to 2021, he was a borough councillor of Neukölln.
