= Jeannette Auricht =

German politician (born 1970)

Member of the Abgeordnetenhaus of Berlin
- Incumbent
- Assumed office 27 October 2016
- Constituency: Marzahn-Hellersdorf 3 (2021–present)

Personal details
- Born: 22 January 1970 (age 56) Berlin
- Party: Alternative for Germany (since 2014)

Jeannette Auricht (born 22 January 1970 in Berlin) is a German politician serving as a member of the Abgeordnetenhaus of Berlin since 2016. From 2015 to 2021, she served as chairwoman of the Alternative for Germany in Marzahn-Hellersdorf.
