= Mieterpartei =

Renters' Party Mieterpartei
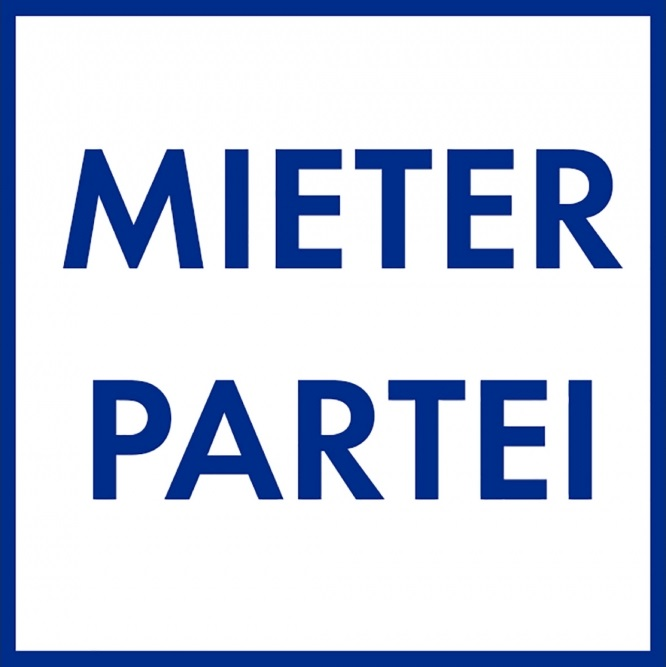
- Abbreviation: MIETERPARTEI
- Leader: Anke Hahn; Hartmut Bräunlich
- Founded: 26 February 2016; 9 years ago, Prenzlauer Berg, Berlin
- Membership (2016): 35
- Ideology: Opposition to high rent Progressivism; Multiculturalism; Environmentalism

Website
- www.mieterpartei-jetzt.de

The Renters' Party (German: Mieterpartei) is a minor political party in Germany. It was founded in Berlin in early 2016, which is also the state it is primarily active in, although regional sections for other cities, such as Mannheim, have also been founded.

== Program ==
The party lists seven most essential points on its website, all related to their main topic - the opposition to high rents and how to combat them. The party suggests a stronger focus on the construction of social and middle class housing instead of luxury apartments, better protections for renters and expropriation in case of long-term vacant housing. It also wants to enshrine a right to housing in the constitution.

In their full party program of 78 pages, however, the party goes more in depth about their policies; these furthermore include anti-corruption, reform of the healthcare system, environmentalism, multiculturalism, a stop to privatization, and an endorsement of parliamentarianism.

== Election results ==
=== Federal elections ===
Year	Party list		Constituency	
Year	Votes	%	Votes	%
2017			1,352	0.0%

=== State elections ===
Year	BE	
Year	Party list	Constituency
2016		0.1% (941)
2021	0.2% (4,261)	0.1% (1,079)
2023	0.3% (3,902)	0.1% (973)

=== Local elections ===
Year	Pankow
2016	0.4% (234)
