= Socialist Equality Party (Germany) =

Trotskyist political party

Socialist Equality Party Sozialistische Gleichheitspartei
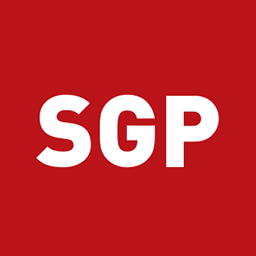
- Abbreviation: SGP
- Leader: Christoph Vandreier
- Honorary Chairman: Ulrich Rippert
- Founded: 1971; 55 years ago (Note: The party was founded in 1971 and changed its name in the 1990s, and again in February 2017.)
- Headquarters: Neuenburger Straße 13, Berlin
- Newspaper: Sozialistische Welt-Website gleichheit
- Youth wing: IYSSE
- Membership (2024): ▲294
- Ideology: Communism; Marxism; Trotskyism
- Political position: Far-left
- International affiliation: ICFI
- Colors: Red
- Bundestag: 0 / 736
- Bundesrat: 0 / 69
- State Parliaments: 0 / 1,894
- European Parliament: 0 / 96
- Heads of State Governments: 0 / 16

Website
- www.gleichheit.de

The Socialist Equality Party (German: Sozialistische Gleichheitspartei, SGP) is a minor Trotskyist political party in Germany.

== History ==
It was founded in September 1971 by Ulrich Rippert under the name Federation of Socialist Workers (Bund Sozialistischer Arbeiter) which participated in several elections after 1983. In 1997, the party was renamed to the Party for Social Equality, Section of the Fourth International (Partei für Soziale Gleichheit, Sektion der Vierten Internationale, PSG) and officially registered as a political party with the Federal Returning Officer on 14 October of that year. The first election the PSG participated in under its new name was the 1998 German federal election, in which the party received 0.01% of the vote. The highest result ever won by the party was that in the 2004 European parliament election, where the party achieved 0.1% of the vote in Germany. On 18–19 February 2017, the party adopted its modern name.

The party's newspaper was published starting in 1971 under the name Der Funke (not to be confused with the modern German-speaking section on the RCI) which was renamed to Neue Arbeiterpresse in 1977 and again to gleichheit in 1997 which exists to this day but lost relevance to the party's main publication on the World Socialist Web Site.

Also in 2017, the SGP won a defamation lawsuit filed against them by Humboldt University professor Jörg Baberowski: the Hamburg district court ruled that the party's right to freedom of speech allowed them to accuse Baberowski of a "distortion of history". The court also ruled that the SGP was able to defend their characterization of Baberowski as a "right-wing extremist" by referencing his statements about Adolf Hitler with a specific example being him saying, "Hitler was not cruel. He did not want people to talk about the extermination of the Jews at his table”.

== Organisation ==
The SGP is a member of the International Committee of the Fourth International (ICFI), and through it is also in contact with other member parties of the ICFI in England, the United States, Sri Lanka, France, Canada and Australia.

While the party's main publication is the World Socialist Web Site, it also maintains its own separate newspaper named gleichheit.

As of 2024 the SGP had 294 members and state sections in Berlin, Hesse, and North Rhine-Westphalia. The leader of the party is Christoph Vandreier.

Membership
Year	Members	+/-
2016	273	–
2024	294	▲21

== Ideology ==
The party sees itself as the German section of the Fourth International in the tradition of Leon Trotsky, representing a particularly orthodox and unchanging version of the ideology. As a Trotskyist party, it is naturally also critical of the former East German and Soviet regimes, viewing the failing of the East German regime in particular as a confirmation of its critical view on the "Stalinist bureaucracy".

The SGP is critical of trade unions (which it views as merely a tool of the labour aristocracy), social democrats, and Stalinist organisations. The party takes an anti-nationalist and anti-capitalist stance, while also supporting the introduction of universal basic income, at 1,500 Euros per month. During the COVID-19 pandemic, the SGP continuously advocated for stronger measures.

On foreign policy, the SGP supports the dissolution of NATO, an end to all weapons exports, and a "United Socialist States of Europe". As of 2024, it disapproves of Germany's support for Ukraine and Israel in their respective conflicts.

The SGP has been classified as a left-wing extremist organization by the Federal Office for the Protection of the Constitution (BfV) and is as such under surveillance, having been characterized as advocating for a "Marxist class thinking that is incompatible with the Basic Law and the propagation of class struggle". The BfV also considers the party as harmless and isolated, being preoccupied primarily with the fight against opposing Trotskyist currents. During the early 2000s, the party was viewed as so irrelevant that it would no longer be listed in the yearly Verfassungsschutzbericht published by the BfV, although remaining under observation. This evaluation changed in 2018, when the party was once again listed in the publication and decided to file a lawsuit against its inclusion which the party lost.

== Election results ==
=== Bundestag ===
Election	Party list		Constituency		Seats
Election	Votes	%	Votes	%	Seats
1990	826	0.0	214	0.0	0
1994	1,285	0.0	–		0
1998	6,226	0.0	–		0
2002	did not contest				
2005	15,605	0.0	–		0
2009	2,957	0.0	–		0
2013	4,564	0.0	–		0
2017	1,291	0.0	903	0.0	0
2021	1,535	0.0	–		0
2025	425	0.0	73	0.0	0

=== European Parliament ===
Election	Votes	%	Seats	+/–	EP Group
1989	7,788	0.03 (#22)	0 / 81	New	–
1994	10,678	0.03 (#28)	0 / 81	0	–
1999	Did not contest		0 / 81	0	–
2004	25,795	0.10 (#23)	0 / 81	0	–
2009	9,646	0.04 (#32)	0 / 81	0	–
2014	8,924	0.03 (#25)	0 / 81	0	–
2019	5,283	0.01 (#41)	0 / 81	0	–
2024	5,923	0.01 (#35)	0 / 81	0	–

== See also ==
- International Socialist Organisation (Germany)
- International Socialist Alternative
- Workers' Power (Germany)

== Literature ==
- Decker, Frank. (2007). Handbuch der deutschen Parteien. Verlag für Sozialwissenschaften. ISBN 976-3-531-15189-2
- The Historical Foundations of the Partei fur Soziale Gleichheit, Mehring Books 2011, ISBN 978-1-875639-41-0 (Online)
