= Die Urbane. Eine HipHop Partei =

The Urbans. A HipHop Party Die Urbane. Eine HipHop Partei
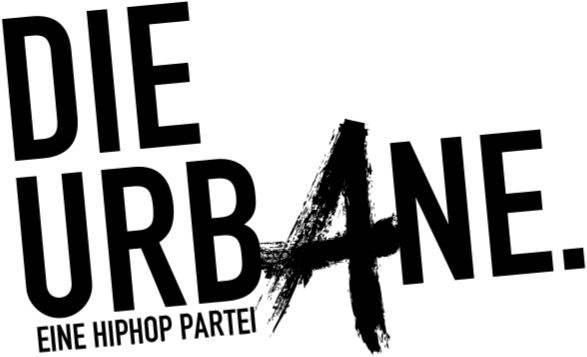
- Leader: Rafael Moussa Hillebrand
- Founded: 1 May 2017
- Headquarters: Berlin
- Membership: 432
- Ideology: Social justice Localism; Environmentalism
- Bundestag: 0 / 709

Website
- www.die-urbane.de

Die Urbane. Eine HipHop Partei (The Urbans. A HipHop Party) is a German political party founded in Berlin in February 2017 which draws inspiration from hip hop culture. The main goals of the party include first and foremost social justice; their self-proclaimed goal is to achieve equality among all citizens. In this context, the party supports the introduction of a universal basic income.

During the German federal election on 24 September 2017, they were among the parties listed in the federal state of Berlin.

== Party positions ==
Die Urbane sees its ideological origins in the "emancipatory, original values" of hip hop, those being "Love, Peace, Unity and having Fun". It distances itself from iterations of current hip hop culture which it sees as misogynistic, consumerist, and antisemitic, among other faults.

The party's program places great emphasis on decoloniality, advocating for reparations for countries colonized by Germany and the introduction of Black Studies and Decolonial Studies at public universities. Many of its leaders are of African descent. Die Urbane also advocates for universal suffrage for people over 14 (the German age of criminal responsibility), regardless of citizenship status. Its program altogether rejects of the nation as a form of political organization. The party also pushes for an expansion of the rights of disabled, FLINTA* and LGBTQ+ people.

In Berlin, the party advocates for free public transport and a reduction in policing, particularly expressing opposition to the 2023 opening of a police station at Kottbusser Tor, an area known for its drug-related crime.

== Election results ==
=== German Parliament ===
Election year	# of constituency votes	# of party list votes	% of overall votes	# of overall seats won
2017	772▲	3,032▲	0.0	0 / 709
2021	1,912▲	17,811▲	0.0	0 / 736
