= List of members of the 19th Berlin House of Representatives (2021–2023) =

19th Berlin House of Representatives
←	18th	19th (2023–26)	→
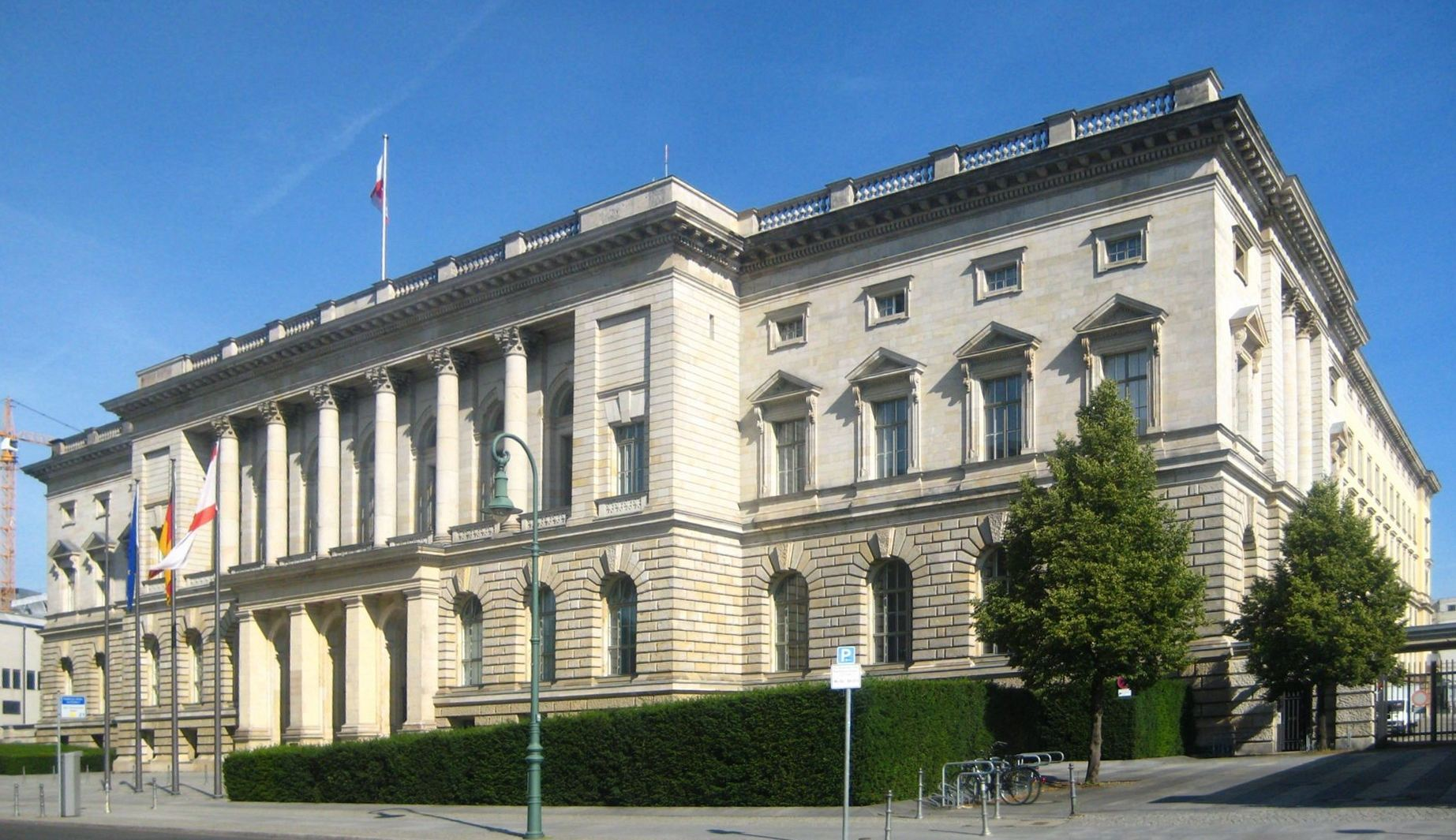
- Preußischer Landtag building in 2009

Overview
- Legislative body: Berlin House of Representatives
- Jurisdiction: Berlin
- Meeting place: Preußischer Landtag building, Berlin
- Term: 4 November 2021 – 15 March 2023
- Election: 26 September 2021
- Members: 147
- President: Dennis Buchner (SPD)

This is a list of members who sat in the 19th Berlin House of Representatives, the state parliament of Berlin, between 2021 and 2023. These members were elected in the 26 September 2021 state election, and the House of Representatives was constituted in its first session on 4 November 2021. Due to irregularities in the election, on 16 November 2022 the results were voided by the Berlin Constitutional Court and new elections ordered. This did not reset the legislative term, meaning the members elected in the 2023 Berlin repeat state election also sit as members of the 19th House of Representatives.

The House of Representatives had 147 members, 17 seats larger than its minimum size of 130. It comprised 36 members of the Social Democratic Party (SPD), 32 members of Alliance 90/The Greens (GRÜNE), 30 members of the Christian Democratic Union (CDU), 24 members of The Left (LINKE), 13 members of the Alternative for Germany (AfD), and 12 members of the Free Democratic Party (FDP).

The President of the House of Representatives was Dennis Buchner (SPD). The Vice Presidents were Bahar Haghanipour (GRÜNE) and Cornelia Seibeld (CDU).

== Presidium ==
President		Party	Ballot	Term
President	Dennis Buchner	SPD	120 / 146	4 Nov. 2021 – dissolution
Vice President	Bahar Haghanipour	GRÜNE	117 / 146	4 Nov. 2021 – dissolution
Vice President	Cornelia Seibeld	CDU	130 / 145	4 Nov. 2021 – dissolution
Source: House of Representatives

== Parliamentary groups ==
Group	Members		Chairperson(s)	
Group	At election	At dissolution	Chairperson(s)	
Social Democratic Party (SPD)	36 / 147	36 / 147	Raed Saleh	4 Nov. 2021 – dissolution
Alliance 90/The Greens (GRÜNE)	32 / 147	32 / 147	Silke Gebel; Antje Kapek	4 Nov. 2021 – 15 Mar. 2022
Alliance 90/The Greens (GRÜNE)	32 / 147	32 / 147	Silke Gebel; Werner Graf	15 Mar. 2022 – dissolution
Christian Democratic Union (CDU)	30 / 147	30 / 147	Kai Wegner	4 Nov. 2021 – dissolution
The Left (LINKE)	24 / 147	24 / 147	Anne Helm; Carsten Schatz	4 Nov. 2021 – dissolution
Alternative for Germany (AfD)	13 / 147	13 / 147	Kristin Brinker	4 Nov. 2021 – dissolution
Free Democratic Party (FDP)	12 / 147	12 / 147	Sebastian Czaja	4 Nov. 2021 – dissolution
Source: House of Representatives

== List of members at dissolution ==
Image	Name	Birth year	Party	Constituency	Vote %	List #	Notes	Ref.
	Gollaleh Ahmadi	1982	GRÜNE	State list		9th		
	Turgut Altuğ	1965	GRÜNE	Friedrichshain-Kreuzberg 3	35.1%			
	Sebahat Atli	1971	SPD	Spandau 1	28.7%			
	Jeannette Auricht	1970	AfD	Marzahn-Hellersdorf 3	22.0%			
	Sevim Aydin	1972	SPD	Friedrichshain-Kreuzberg list		1st		
	Frank Balzer	1964	CDU	Reinickendorf 6	38.6%			
	Tobias Bauschke	1987	FDP	Steglitz-Zehlendorf list		2nd		
	Franziska Becker	1967	SPD	Charlottenburg-Wilmersdorf list		1st		
	Daniela Billig	1970	GRÜNE	Pankow 8	38.2%			
	Tuba Bozkurt	1983	GRÜNE	Mitte 6	29.8%			
	Elke Breitenbach	1961	LINKE	State list		2nd		
	Kristin Brinker	1972	AfD	State list		1st	Faction leader	
	Hugh Bronson	1961	AfD	State list		10th		
	Antonin Brousek	1962	AfD	State list		9th		
	Sandra Brunner	1972	LINKE	State list		21st		
	Franziska Brychcy	1984	LINKE	State list		13th		
	Dennis Buchner	1977	SPD	Pankow 4	24.1%		President of the House of Representatives	
	Stefanie Bung	1978	CDU	Charlottenburg-Wilmersdorf list		1st		
	Marianne Burkert-Eulitz	1972	GRÜNE	Friedrichshain-Kreuzberg 2	38.5%			
	Derya Çağlar	1982	SPD	Neukölln 3	27.2%			
	Sebastian Czaja	1983	FDP	Steglitz-Zehlendorf list		1st	Faction leader	
	Ina Czyborra	1966	SPD	Steglitz-Zehlendorf list		1st		
	Michael Dietmann	1968	CDU	Reinickendorf 5	30.7%			
	Florian Dörstelmann	1967	SPD	Charlottenburg-Wilmersdorf 7	26.2%			
	Lars Düsterhöft	1981	SPD	Treptow-Köpenick 2	31.4%			
	Claudia Engelmann	1980	LINKE	Lichtenberg 3	24.5%			
	Elif Eralp	1981	LINKE	State list		7th		
	Stefan Evers	1979	CDU	Treptow-Köpenick list		2nd		
	Christopher Förster	1986	CDU	Neukölln list		2nd		
	Stefan Förster	1981	FDP	Treptow-Köpenick list		1st		
	Vasili Franco	1992	GRÜNE	Friedrichshain-Kreuzberg 5	34.3%			
	Paul Fresdorf	1977	FDP	Spandau list		1st		
	Danny Freymark	1983	CDU	Lichtenberg 1	25.5%			
	Oliver Friederici	1970	CDU	Steglitz-Zehlendorf 5	29.4%			
	Silke Gebel	1983	GRÜNE	Mitte 1	35.2%		Faction co-leader	
	Andreas Geisel	1966	SPD	Lichtenberg 6	27.1%			
	Katalin Gennburg	1984	LINKE	Treptow-Köpenick 1	26.2%			
	Franziska Giffey	1978	SPD	Neukölln 6	40.8%		Governing Mayor	
	Ronald Gläser	1973	AfD	State list		2nd		
	Christian Goiny	1965	CDU	Steglitz-Zehlendorf 3	31.3%			
	Mirjam Golm	1970	SPD	Steglitz-Zehlendorf list		3rd		
	Werner Graf	1980	GRÜNE	State list		6th	Faction co-leader (from 15 Mar 2022)	
	Christian Gräff	1978	CDU	Marzahn-Hellersdorf 4	35.5%			
	Adrian Grasse	1975	CDU	Steglitz-Zehlendorf 6	31.0%			
	Katharina Günther-Wünsch	1983	CDU	Marzahn-Hellersdorf 5	33.7%			
	Ariturel Hack	1989	CDU	Charlottenburg-Wilmersdorf 2	28.4%			
	Bahar Haghanipour	1984	GRÜNE	State list		3rd	Vice President of the House of Representatives	
	Frank-Christian Hansel	1964	AfD	State list		5th		
	Oda Hassepaß	1974	GRÜNE	Pankow 3	23.8%			
	Ellen Haußdörfer	1980	SPD	Treptow-Köpenick 3	22.9%			
	Sven Heinemann	1978	SPD	Friedrichshain-Kreuzberg list		2nd		
	Anne Helm	1986	LINKE	State list		5th	Faction co-leader	
	Alexander J. Herrmann	1975	CDU	Marzahn-Hellersdorf 6	27.9%			
	Christian Hochgrebe	1973	SPD	Charlottenburg-Wilmersdorf 1	27.5%			
	Torsten Hofer	1980	SPD	Pankow 2	22.7%			
	Marcel Hopp	1988	SPD	Neukölln 4	36.2%			
	Maren Jasper-Winter	1977	FDP	Mitte list		1st		
	Björn Jotzo	1975	FDP	Charlottenburg-Wilmersdorf list		1st		
	Robbin Juhnke	1967	CDU	Neukölln list		1st		
	Alexander Kaas Elias	1973	GRÜNE	Charlottenburg-Wilmersdorf 6	26.4%			
	Susanna Kahlefeld	1964	GRÜNE	Neukölln 2	32.9%			
	Antje Kapek	1976	GRÜNE	State list		2nd	Faction co-leader (until 15 Mar 2022)	
	Sandra Khalatbari	1971	CDU	Charlottenburg-Wilmersdorf 5	29.6%			
	Alexander King	1969	LINKE	State list		22nd	Moved up after the resignation of Sebastian Scheel (15 Dec. 2021)	
	Hendrikje Klein	1979	LINKE	Lichtenberg 5	26.3%			
	Florian Kluckert	1975	FDP	Neukölln list		1st		
	Ferat Koçak	1979	LINKE	State list		14th		
	Matthias Kollatz-Ahnen	1957	SPD	Steglitz-Zehlendorf 2	27.9%			
	Bettina König	1978	SPD	Reinickendorf 1	27.2%			
	Scott Körber	1971	CDU	Tempelhof-Schöneberg 6	33.1%			
	Johannes Kraft	1977	CDU	Pankow 1	25.4%			
	Holger Krestel	1955	FDP	Tempelhof-Schöneberg list		1st		
	Louis Krüger	1996	GRÜNE	Pankow 5	21.9%			
	Melanie Kühnemann-Grunow	1972	SPD	Tempelhof-Schöneberg list		2nd		
	Taylan Kurt	1988	GRÜNE	Mitte 4	36.9%			
	Harald Laatsch	1956	AfD	State list		4th		
	Max Landero	1991	SPD	Mitte 2	22.1%			
	Klaus Lederer	1974	LINKE	State list		1st		
	Jan Lehmann	1971	SPD	Marzahn-Hellersdorf list		2nd		
	Franziska Leschewitz	1989	LINKE	State list		23rd	Moved up after the resignation of Stefanie fuchs (30 Nov. 2022)	
	Nina Lerch	1984	SPD	Neukölln 5	30.3%			
	Dirk Liebe	1972	SPD	Lichtenberg list		3rd		
	Gunnar Lindemann	1970	AfD	Marzahn-Hellersdorf 1	22.6%			
	Tamara Lüdke	1991	SPD	Lichtenberg list		2nd		
	Benedikt Lux	1981	GRÜNE	Steglitz-Zehlendorf 1	28.9%			
	Stephan Machulik	1972	SPD	Spandau 3	29.2%			
	Sibylle Meister	1963	FDP	Reinickendorf list		1st		
	Heiko Melzer	1976	CDU	Spandau 4	31.5%			
	Sven Meyer	1975	SPD	Reinickendorf list		3rd		
	Laura Neugebauer	1995	GRÜNE	Mitte 7	28.1%			
	Jian Omar	1985	GRÜNE	Mitte 3	31.9%			
	Andreas Otto	1962	GRÜNE	Pankow 6	41.3%			
	Orkan Özdemir	1982	SPD	Tempelhof-Schöneberg 3	32.0%			
	Martin Pätzold	1984	CDU	Lichtenberg 2	21.3%			
	Maik Penn	1981	CDU	Treptow-Köpenick list		1st		
	Catherina Pieroth-Manelli	1966	GRÜNE	Tempelhof-Schöneberg 2	35.9%			
	Lars Rauchfuß	1986	SPD	Tempelhof-Schöneberg 5	28.0%			
	Felix Reifschneider	1978	FDP	Pankow list		1st		
	Sven Rissmann	1978	CDU	Mitte list		1st		
	Roman-Francesco Rogat	1989	FDP	Marzahn-Hellersdorf list		1st		
	Kristian Ronneburg	1986	LINKE	State list		16th		
	Raed Saleh	1977	SPD	Spandau 2	32.1%		Faction leader	
	Robert Schaddach	1966	SPD	Treptow-Köpenick 2	31.4%			
	Carsten Schatz	1970	LINKE	State list		6th	Faction co-leader	
	Klara Schedlich	2000	GRÜNE	State list		7th		
	Niklas Schenker	1993	LINKE	State list		20th		
	Sebastian Schlüsselburg	1983	LINKE	Lichtenberg 4	29.4%			
	Katrin Schmidberger	1982	GRÜNE	Friedrichshain-Kreuzberg 1	41.3%			
	Ines Schmidt	1960	LINKE	State list		17th		
	Manuela Schmidt	1963	LINKE	Marzahn-Hellersdorf 2	24.1%			
	Stephan Schmidt	1973	CDU	Reinickendorf 3	33.4%			
	Torsten Schneider	1969	SPD	Pankow list			Moved up after the resignation of Tino Schopf (27 Dec. 2021)	
	Julia Schneider	1990	GRÜNE	Pankow 7	30.7%			
	Niklas Schrader	1981	LINKE	State list		18th		
	Tom Schreiber	1978	SPD	Treptow-Köpenick 5	26.0%			
	Katina Schubert	1961	LINKE	State list		3rd		
	Mathias Schulz	1985	SPD	Mitte 5	25.6%			
	André Schulze	1987	GRÜNE	Neukölln 1	33.8%			
	Tobias Schulze	1976	LINKE	State list		8th		
	Julian Schwarze	1983	GRÜNE	Friedrichshain-Kreuzberg 6	38.6%			
	Cornelia Seibeld	1974	CDU	Steglitz-Zehlendorf 4	31.7%		Vice President of the House of Representatives	
	Katrin Seidel	1967	LINKE	State list		11th		
	Roman Simon	1974	CDU	Tempelhof-Schöneberg list		2nd		
	Iris Spranger	1961	SPD	Marzahn-Hellersdorf list		1st		
	Stephan Standfuß	1972	CDU	Steglitz-Zehlendorf 7	30.7%			
	Dirk Stettner	1969	CDU	Pankow list		1st		
	Jörg Stroedter	1954	SPD	Reinickendorf 2	26.7%			
	Aferdita Suka	1980	GRÜNE	Tempelhof-Schöneberg 4	25.7%			
	Tommy Tabor	1982	AfD	State list		11th		
	Stefan Taschner	1969	GRÜNE	State list		10th	Moved up after the resignation of Bettina Jarasch (3 Jan. 2022)	
	Martin Trefzer	1969	AfD	State list		6th		
	Damiano Valgolio	1981	LINKE	Friedrichshain-Kreuzberg 4	24.7%			
	Marc Vallendar	1986	AfD	State list		8th		
	Petra Vandrey	1965	GRÜNE	Charlottenburg-Wilmersdorf 3	30.9%			
	Catrin Wahlen	1972	GRÜNE	State list		11th	Moved up after the resignation of Daniel Wesener (3 Jan. 2022)	
	Sebastian Walter	1979	GRÜNE	Tempelhof-Schöneberg 1	33.2%			
	Kurt Wansner	1947	CDU	Friedrichshain-Kreuzberg list		1st	Father of the House	
	Christoph Wapler	1969	GRÜNE	Charlottenburg-Wilmersdorf 4	27.0%			
	Kai Wegner	1972	CDU	Spandau list		1st	Faction leader	
	Thorsten Weiß	1983	AfD	State list		7th		
	Björn Wohlert	1988	CDU	Reinickendorf 4	28.4%			
	Karsten Woldeit	1975	AfD	State list		3rd		
	Christian Wolf	1978	FDP	Lichtenberg list		1st		
	Dunja Wolff	1962	SPD	Treptow-Köpenick 6	22.0%			
	Christian Zander	1978	CDU	Tempelhof-Schöneberg 7	35.6%			
	Stefan Ziller	1981	GRÜNE	State list		8th		
	Steffen Zillich	1971	LINKE	State list		10th		

== List of former members ==
Image	Name	Birth year	Party	Constituency	Vote %	List #	Date of departure	Notes	Ref.
	Stefanie Fuchs	1975	LINKE	State list		15th	30 November 2022	Resigned Replaced by Franziska Leschewitz	
	Bettina Jarasch	1968	GRÜNE	State list		1st	31 December 2021	Resigned after joining the Giffey senate Replaced by Stefan Taschner	
	Sebastian Scheel	1975	LINKE	State list		4th	14 December 2021	Resigned Replaced by Alexander King	
	Tino Schopf	1974	SPD	Pankow 9	27.4%		23 December 2021	Resigned after joining the Giffey senate Replaced by Torsten Schneider	
	Daniel Wesener	1975	GRÜNE	State list		4th	3 January 2022	Resigned after joining the Giffey senate Replaced by Catrin Wahlen	
