= List of members of the 19th Berlin House of Representatives (2023–2026) =

19th Berlin House of Representatives
←	19th (2021–23)
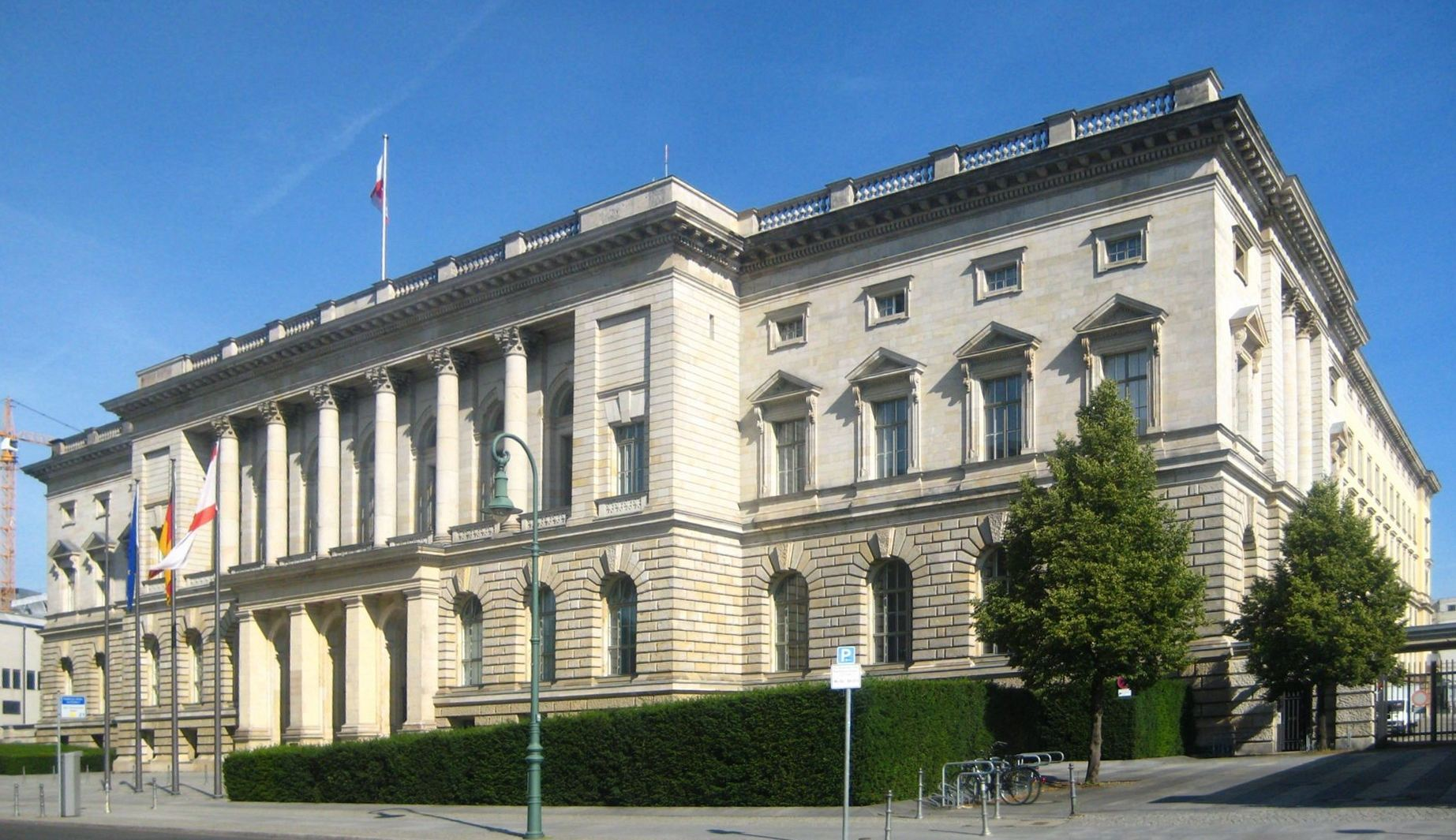
- Preußischer Landtag building in 2009

Overview
- Legislative body: Berlin House of Representatives
- Jurisdiction: Berlin
- Meeting place: Preußischer Landtag building, Berlin
- Term: 16 March 2023 –
- Election: 12 February 2023
- Members: 159
- President: Cornelia Seibeld (CDU)

This is a list of members who are sitting in the 19th Berlin House of Representatives, the state parliament of Berlin, from 2023 to 2026. These members were elected in the 12 February 2023 state election. This was the second election to the 19th House of Representatives, after the original November 2021 election was voided due to irregularities. The new membership sat for the first time on 16 March 2023.

The House of Representatives has 159 members, 29 seats larger than its minimum size of 130. It comprises 52 members of the Christian Democratic Union (CDU), 34 members each of the Social Democratic Party (SPD) and Alliance 90/The Greens (GRÜNE), 22 members of The Left (LINKE), and 17 members of the Alternative for Germany (AfD).

The President of the House of Representatives is Cornelia Seibeld (CDU). The Vice Presidents are Dennis Buchner (SPD) and Bahar Haghanipour (GRÜNE).

== Presidium ==
President		Party	Ballot	Term
President	Cornelia Seibeld	CDU	117 / 157	16 Mar. 2023 – present
Vice President	Dennis Buchner	SPD	127 / 157	16 Mar. 2023 – present
Vice President	Bahar Haghanipour	GRÜNE	122 / 157	16 Mar. 2023 – present
Source: House of Representatives

== Parliamentary groups ==
Group	Members		Chairperson(s)	
Group	At election	Current	Chairperson(s)	
Christian Democratic Union (CDU)	52 / 159	52 / 159	Kai Wegner	16 Mar. 2023 – present
Social Democratic Party (SPD)	34 / 159	34 / 159	Raed Saleh	16 Mar. 2023 – present
Alliance 90/The Greens (GRÜNE)	34 / 159	34 / 159	Werner Graf; Bettina Jarasch	16 Mar. 2023 – present
The Left (LINKE)	22 / 159	22 / 159	Anne Helm; Carsten Schatz	16 Mar. 2023 – present
Alternative for Germany (AfD)	17 / 159	17 / 159	Kristin Brinker	16 Mar. 2023 – present
Source: House of Representatives

== List of current members ==
Image	Name	Birth year	Party	Constituency	Vote %	List #	Notes	Ref.
	Gollaleh Ahmadi	1982	GRÜNE	State list		9th		
	Turgut Altuğ	1965	GRÜNE	Friedrichshain-Kreuzberg 3	35.1%			
	Sebahat Atli	1971	SPD	Spandau list		1st		
	Jeannette Auricht	1970	AfD	Marzahn-Hellersdorf 3	25.9%			
	Sevim Aydin	1972	SPD	Friedrichshain-Kreuzberg list		1st		
	Frank Balzer	1964	CDU	Reinickendorf 6	45.7%			
	Franziska Becker	1967	SPD	Charlottenburg-Wilmersdorf list		1st		
	Alexander Bertram	1988	AfD	State list		12th		
	Michael Biel	1980	SPD	Tempelhof-Schöneberg list		3rd		
	Daniela Billig	1970	GRÜNE	Pankow 8	37.2%			
	Lars Bocian	1969	CDU	Pankow 2	31.4%			
	Tuba Bozkurt	1983	GRÜNE	Mitte 6	32.0%			
	Kerstin Brauner	1976	CDU	Spandau 3	34.4%			
	Elke Breitenbach	1961	LINKE	State list		2nd		
	Kristin Brinker	1972	AfD	State list		1st	Faction leader	
	Hugh Bronson	1961	AfD	State list		10th		
	Antonin Brousek	1962	AfD	State list		9th		
	Sandra Brunner	1972	LINKE	State list		21st		
	Franziska Brychcy	1984	LINKE	State list		13th		
	Dennis Buchner	1977	SPD	Pankow list		3rd	Vice President of the House of Representatives	
	Stefanie Bung	1978	CDU	Charlottenburg-Wilmersdorf 7	34.2%			
	Marianne Burkert-Eulitz	1972	GRÜNE	Friedrichshain-Kreuzberg 2	37.9%			
	Derya Çağlar	1982	SPD	Neukölln 3	23.4%			
	Tom Cywinski	1987	CDU	Steglitz-Zehlendorf 2	31.3%			
	Ina Czyborra	1966	SPD	Steglitz-Zehlendorf list		1st		
	Michael Dietmann	1968	CDU	Reinickendorf 5	42.8%			
	Burkard Dregger	1964	CDU	Reinickendorf 1	37.2%			
	Lars Düsterhöft	1981	SPD	Treptow-Köpenick 2	29.2%			
	Ario Ebrahimpour Mirzaie	1985	GRÜNE	State list		18th		
	Elif Eralp	1981	LINKE	State list		7th		
	Robert Eschricht	1985	AfD	State list		15th		
	Stefan Evers	1979	CDU	Treptow-Köpenick 3	32.7%			
	Christopher Förster	1986	CDU	Neukölln 4	43.0%			
	Vasili Franco	1992	GRÜNE	Friedrichshain-Kreuzberg 5	36.1%			
	Danny Freymark	1983	CDU	Lichtenberg 1	40.8%			
	Oliver Friederici	1970	CDU	Steglitz-Zehlendorf 5	41.2%			
	Olga Gauks	1987	CDU	Marzahn-Hellersdorf 2	25.5%			
	Silke Gebel	1983	GRÜNE	Mitte 1	33.5%			
	Andreas Geisel	1966	SPD	Lichtenberg list		1st		
	Katalin Gennburg	1984	LINKE	Treptow-Köpenick 1	25.9%			
	Franziska Giffey	1978	SPD	Neukölln list		1st		
	Ronald Gläser	1973	AfD	State list		2nd		
	Christian Goiny	1965	CDU	Steglitz-Zehlendorf 3	40.5%			
	Mirjam Golm	1970	SPD	Steglitz-Zehlendorf list		3rd		
	Werner Graf	1980	GRÜNE	State list		6th	Faction co-leader	
	Christian Gräff	1978	CDU	Marzahn-Hellersdorf 4	42.9%			
	Adrian Grasse	1975	CDU	Steglitz-Zehlendorf 6	40.0%			
	Niklas Graßelt	1993	CDU	Marzahn-Hellersdorf list		7th		
	Katharina Günther-Wünsch	1983	CDU	Marzahn-Hellersdorf 5	45.0%			
	Ariturel Hack	1989	CDU	Charlottenburg-Wilmersdorf 2	38.7%			
	Bahar Haghanipour	1984	GRÜNE	State list		3rd	Vice President of the House of Representatives	
	Frank-Christian Hansel	1964	AfD	State list		5th		
	Stefan Häntsch	1987	CDU	Charlottenburg-Wilmersdorf 1	28.3%			
	Oda Hassepaß	1974	GRÜNE	Pankow 3	24.7%			
	Ellen Haußdörfer	1980	SPD	Treptow-Köpenick list		1st		
	Dennis Haustein	1990	CDU	Lichtenberg 3	23.4%			
	Sven Heinemann	1978	SPD	Friedrichshain-Kreuzberg list		2nd		
	Anne Helm	1986	LINKE	State list		5th	Faction co-leader	
	Alexander Herrmann	1975	CDU	Marzahn-Hellersdorf 6	37.7%			
	Marcel Hopp	1988	SPD	Neukölln list		4th	Moved up after Fabian Fischer declined his mandate	
	Timur Husein	1980	CDU	Friedrichshain-Kreuzberg list		2nd		
	Bettina Jarasch	1968	GRÜNE	State list		1st	Faction co-leader	
	Robbin Juhnke	1967	CDU	Neukölln 5	43.1%			
	Susanna Kahlefeld	1964	GRÜNE	Neukölln 2	34.5%			
	Antje Kapek	1976	GRÜNE	State list		2nd		
	Sandra Khalatbari	1971	CDU	Charlottenburg-Wilmersdorf 5	42.3%			
	Hendrikje Klein	1979	LINKE	Lichtenberg 5	25.0%			
	Lisa-Bettina Knack	1986	CDU	Treptow-Köpenick 4	27.2%			
	Ferat Koçak	1979	LINKE	State list		14th		
	Matthias Kollatz-Ahnen	1957	SPD	Steglitz-Zehlendorf list		2nd		
	Bettina König	1978	SPD	Reinickendorf list		2nd		
	Scott Körber	1971	CDU	Tempelhof-Schöneberg 6	47.5%			
	Johannes Kraft	1977	CDU	Pankow 1	41.6%			
	Louis Krüger	1996	GRÜNE	Pankow 5	22.2%			
	Melanie Kühnemann-Grunow	1972	SPD	Tempelhof-Schöneberg list		2nd		
	Taylan Kurt	1988	GRÜNE	Mitte 4	40.1%			
	Harald Laatsch	1956	AfD	State list		4th		
	Maja Lasić	1979	SPD	Mitte list		1st		
	Klaus Lederer	1974	LINKE	State list		1st		
	Jan Lehmann	1971	SPD	Marzahn-Hellersdorf list		2nd		
	Stephan Lenz	1968	CDU	Pankow list		2nd		
	Gunnar Lindemann	1970	AfD	Marzahn-Hellersdorf 1	28.8%			
	Tamara Lüdke	1991	SPD	Lichtenberg list		2nd		
	Frank Luhmann	1986	CDU	Tempelhof-Schöneberg 4	28.5%			
	Martin Matz	1965	SPD	Steglitz-Zehlendorf list		4th		
	Bettina Meißner	1970	CDU	Spandau 1	37.3%			
	Heiko Melzer	1976	CDU	Spandau 4	45.3%			
	Sven Meyer	1975	SPD	Reinickendorf list		3rd		
	Peer Mock-Stümer	1967	CDU	Charlottenburg-Wilmersdorf 6	29.2%			
	Ersin Nas	1978	CDU	Spandau 2	33.2%			
	Reinhard Naumann	1960	SPD	Charlottenburg-Wilmersdorf list		2nd		
	Laura Neugebauer	1995	GRÜNE	Mitte 7	30.1%			
	Aldona Niemczyk	1969	CDU	Charlottenburg-Wilmersdorf 4	28.7%			
	Jian Omar	1985	GRÜNE	Mitte 3	33.0%			
	Andreas Otto	1962	GRÜNE	Pankow 6	41.7%			
	Orkan Özdemir	1982	SPD	Tempelhof-Schöneberg 3	32.0%			
	Martin Pätzold	1984	CDU	Lichtenberg 2	39.5%			
	Maik Penn	1981	CDU	Treptow-Köpenick 6	31.6%			
	Catherina Pieroth-Manelli	1966	GRÜNE	Tempelhof-Schöneberg 2	36.9%			
	Ülker Radziwill	1966	SPD	Charlottenburg-Wilmersdorf list		3rd		
	Lars Rauchfuß	1986	SPD	Tempelhof-Schöneberg list		1st		
	Sven Rissmann	1978	CDU	Mitte 5	24.4%			
	Kristian Ronneburg	1986	LINKE	State list		16th		
	Raed Saleh	1977	SPD	Spandau 1		1st	Faction leader	
	Martin Sattelklau	1957	CDU	Treptow-Köpenick 5	27.7%			
	Lucas Schaal	1990	CDU	Mitte 2	24.9%			
	Carsten Schatz	1970	LINKE	State list		6th	Faction co-leader	
	Klara Schedlich	2000	GRÜNE	State list		7th		
	Sebastian Scheel	1975	LINKE	State list		4th		
	Olaf Schenk	1974	CDU	Neukölln 6	45.3%			
	Niklas Schenker	1993	LINKE	State list		20th		
	Sebastian Schlüsselburg	1983	LINKE	Lichtenberg 4	27.2%			
	Katrin Schmidberger	1982	GRÜNE	Friedrichshain-Kreuzberg 1	40.3%			
	Ines Schmidt	1960	LINKE	State list		17th		
	Manuela Schmidt	1963	LINKE	State list		9th		
	Stephan Schmidt	1973	CDU	Reinickendorf 3	44.1%			
	Torsten Schneider	1969	SPD	Pankow list		1st		
	Julia Schneider	1990	GRÜNE	Pankow 7	30.9%			
	Tino Schopf	1974	SPD	Pankow 9	25.6%			
	Niklas Schrader	1981	LINKE	State list		18th		
	Katina Schubert	1961	LINKE	State list		3rd		
	Mathias Schulz	1985	SPD	Mitte list		2nd		
	André Schulze	1987	GRÜNE	Neukölln 1	35.1%			
	Tobias Schulze	1976	LINKE	State list		8th		
	Julian Schwarze	1983	GRÜNE	Friedrichshain-Kreuzberg 6	39.5%			
	Cornelia Seibeld	1974	CDU	Steglitz-Zehlendorf 4	41.9%		President of the House of Representatives	
	Katrin Seidel	1967	LINKE	State list		11th		
	Katharina Senge	1982	CDU	Tempelhof-Schöneberg list		3rd		
	Roman Simon	1974	CDU	Tempelhof-Schöneberg 5	40.3%			
	Iris Spranger	1961	SPD	Marzahn-Hellersdorf list		1st		
	Stephan Standfuß	1972	CDU	Steglitz-Zehlendorf 7	40.1%			
	Dirk Stettner	1969	CDU	Pankow 4	30.2%			
	Jörg Stroedter	1954	SPD	Reinickendorf list		1st		
	Tommy Tabor	1982	AfD	State list		11th		
	Stefan Taschner	1969	GRÜNE	State list		10th		
	June Tomiak	1997	GRÜNE	State list		13th		
	Martin Trefzer	1969	AfD	State list		6th		
	Carsten Ubbelohde	1962	AfD	State list		14th		
	Lilia Usik	1989	CDU	Lichtenberg 6	22.4%			
	Damiano Valgolio	1981	LINKE	Friedrichshain-Kreuzberg 4	24.7%			
	Marc Vallendar	1986	AfD	State list		8th		
	Petra Vandrey	1965	GRÜNE	Charlottenburg-Wilmersdorf 3	29.2%			
	Linda Vierecke	1982	SPD	Pankow list		2nd		
	Catrin Wahlen	1972	GRÜNE	State list		11th		
	Sebastian Walter	1979	GRÜNE	Tempelhof-Schöneberg 1	34.4%			
	Kurt Wansner	1947	CDU	Friedrichshain-Kreuzberg list		1st	Father of the House	
	Christoph Wapler	1969	GRÜNE	State list		16th		
	Kai Wegner	1972	CDU	Spandau 5	46.9%		Faction leader	
	Claudia Wein	1958	CDU	Steglitz-Zehlendorf 1	30.2%			
	Thorsten Weiß	1983	AfD	State list		7th		
	Daniel Wesener	1975	GRÜNE	State list		4th		
	Rolf Wiedenhaupt	1958	AfD	State list		13th		
	Björn Wohlert	1988	CDU	Reinickendorf 4	41.3%			
	Tonka Wojahn	1975	GRÜNE	State list		15th		
	Karsten Woldeit	1975	AfD	State list		3rd		
	Dunja Wolff	1962	SPD	Treptow-Köpenick list		3rd		
	Christian Zander	1978	CDU	Tempelhof-Schöneberg 7	49.6%			
	Stefan Ziller	1981	GRÜNE	State list		8th		
	Steffen Zillich	1971	LINKE	State list		10th		

== List of former members ==
Image	Name	Birth year	Party	Constituency	Vote %	List #	Date of departure	Notes	Ref.
	Fabian Fischer	1986	SPD	Neukölln list		2nd	8 March 2023	Declined his mandate Replaced by Marcel Hopp	
