= Charlottenburg-Wilmersdorf 1 =

State electoral district of Germany

- Electoral district for the Berlin House of Representatives
- Charlottenburg-Wilmersdorf 1 in 2026
- District: Charlottenburg-Wilmersdorf
- Electorate: 28,767 (2026)

Current electoral district
- Party: The Left
- Member: Niklas Schenker

Charlottenburg-Wilmersdorf 1 is an electoral constituency (German: Wahlkreis) represented in the House of Representatives of Berlin. It elects one member via first-past-the-post voting.

== Geography ==
The constituency comprises the district of Charlottenburg North, and the residential areas of Kalowswerder around Mierendorffplatz and Alt-Lietzow northeast of Otto-Suhr-Allee, within the borough of Charlottenburg-Wilmersdorf.

There were 28,767 eligible voters in 2026.

== Members ==
Election	Member	Party	%
1995	Siegfried Helias	CDU	46.0
1999	Uwe Goetze	CDU	51.5
2001	Felicitas Tesch	SPD	40.3
2006	Felicitas Tesch	SPD	40.6
2011	Fréderic Verrycken	SPD	36.1
2016	Fréderic Verrycken	SPD	29.0
2021	Christian Hochgrebe	SPD	27.5
2023	Stefan Häntsch	CDU	28.3
2026	Niklas Schenker	Left	24.8

== Election results ==
=== 2026 election ===
State election (2026): Charlottenburg-Wilmersdorf 1
Notes:	Blue background denotes the winner of the electorate vote. Pink background denotes a candidate elected from their party list. Yellow background denotes an electorate win by a list member, or other incumbent. A ✓ or ✗ denotes status of any incumbent, win or lose respectively.						
Party	Candidate	Votes	%	±%	Party votes	%	±%
Left	Niklas Schenker	4,904	24.8	▲16.8	5,172	26.0	▲17.2
SPD	Nicola Aleksander Kaufmann	4,009	20.3	▼3.0	2,959	14.9	▼5.9
CDU	Vivien-Nathalie Keilbar	3,326	16.8	▼11.4	3,486	17.6	▼9.9
AfD	Marc Vallendar	2,770	14.0	▲6.2	2,821	14.2	▲6.2
Greens	Jana Brix	2,613	13.2	▼8.0	2,778	14.0	▼6.2
BSW	Tereza Schebsdat	790	4.0		976	4.9	
FDP	Nicolas Wollschlaeger	510	2.6	▼2.3	581	2.9	▼2.5
Tierschutzpartei	Fabian Dufossé	464	2.4	▼0.8	459	2.3	▼0.2
Volt	Juliane Kalbacker	354	1.8		393	2.0	▲1.0
PARTEI					117	0.6	▼0.6
PdF					58	0.3	
ÖDP					30	0.2	▲0.1
du.					11	0.1	▼0.1
DKP					8	0.0	Steady
SGP					6	0.0	Steady
Informal votes		343			228		
Total valid votes		19,740			19,855		
Turnout		20,083	69.8	▲12.8			
Left gain from CDU	Majority	895	4.5				

=== 2023 repeat election ===
Changes denoted below for the 2023 election are compared to the 2016 election, as the 2021 election was declared invalid.

State election (2023): Charlottenburg-Wilmersdorf 1
Notes:	Blue background denotes the winner of the electorate vote. Pink background denotes a candidate elected from their party list. Yellow background denotes an electorate win by a list member, or other incumbent. A ✓ or ✗ denotes status of any incumbent, win or lose respectively.						
Party	Candidate	Votes	%	±%	Party votes	%	±%
CDU	Stefan Häntsch	4,489	28.3	▲9.0	4,357	27.4	▲9.4
SPD	Christian Hochgrebe	3,694	23.3	▼5.7	3,307	20.8	▼3.3
Greens	Jana Brix	3,366	21.2	▲5.7	3,206	20.2	▲4.1
Left	Henriette Kupke	1,281	8.1	▼0.8	1,406	8.8	▼1.1
AfD	Marc Vallendar	1,238	7.8	▼6.8	1,269	8.0	▼6.4
FDP	Jens Martin Wollschlaeger	770	4.9	▼2.7	863	5.4	▼2.6
Tierschutzpartei	Maria Stupka	500	3.2		404	2.5	▲0.5
PARTEI	Annett von der Heydt Freifrau von Massenbach	274	1.7	▼0.5	191	1.2	▼0.6
Volt					158	1.0	
Team Todenhöfer					123	0.8	
dieBasis	Heike Franziska Bartsch	143	0.9		106	0.7	
Gray Panthers					76	0.5	▼0.8
Pirates					58	0.4	▼1.6
Mieterpartei					50	0.3	
The Grays					49	0.3	
FW	Eva-Marie Wessling	69	0.4		40	0.3	
Independent	Murah Sah	39	0.2				
Humanists					38	0.2	
Verjüngungsforschung					32	0.2	▼0.3
Klimaliste					31	0.2	
du.					28	0.2	
NPD					16	0.1	▼0.2
Bildet Berlin!					14	0.1	
ÖDP					13	0.1	
New Democrats					13	0.1	
DKP					12	0.1	Steady
Bergpartei, die ÜberPartei					8	0.1	
German Conservative					7	0.0	
The Pinks/Alliance 21					6	0.0	
LKR					4	0.0	▼0.4
SGP					4	0.0	▼0.1
BüSo					1	0.0	▼0.1
Informal votes		153			130		
Total valid votes		15,863			15,890		
Turnout		16,037	57.0	▼4.4			
CDU gain from SPD	Majority	795	5.0				

=== 2021 election (annulled) ===
The election in 2021 was annulled and rerun in 2023.

State election (2021): Charlottenburg-Wilmersdorf 1
Notes:	Blue background denotes the winner of the electorate vote. Pink background denotes a candidate elected from their party list. Yellow background denotes an electorate win by a list member, or other incumbent. A ✓ or ✗ denotes status of any incumbent, win or lose respectively.						
Party	Candidate	Votes	%	±%	Party votes	%	±%
SPD	Christian Hochgrebe	5,466	27.6	▼1.4	4,893	24.4	▲0.3
Greens	Jana Brix	4,250	21.5	▲5.9	4,076	20.3	▲4.3
CDU	Stefan Häntsch	3,642	18.4	▼0.9	3,485	17.4	▼0.7
Left	Henriette Kupke	1,719	8.7	▼0.2	1,883	9.4	▼0.6
FDP	Jens Martin Wollschlaeger	1,566	7.9	▲0.4	1,642	8.2	▲0.1
AfD	Marc Vallendar	1,442	7.3	▼7.4	1,458	7.3	▼7.1
Tierschutzpartei	Maria Stupka	677	3.4		434	2.2	▲0.1
PARTEI	Annett von der Heydt Freifrau von Massenbach	457	2.3	▲0.1	384	1.9	▲0.1
Team Todenhöfer					342	1.7	
Volt					255	1.3	
dieBasis	Heike Franziska Bartsch	332	1.7		245	1.2	
FW	Eva-Marie Wessling	224	1.1		149	0.7	
The Grays					110	0.5	
Gray Panthers					99	0.5	▼0.8
APT					97	0.5	
Pirates					89	0.4	▼1.5
Humanists					60	0.3	
Klimaliste					54	0.3	
Mieterpartei					52	0.3	
Verjüngungsforschung					46	0.2	▼0.3
du.					40	0.2	
Independent	Murah Sah	38	0.2				
ÖDP					26	0.1	
Bergpartei, die ÜberPartei					21	0.1	
New Democrats					19	0.1	
Bildet Berlin!					17	0.1	
NPD					17	0.1	▼0.2
The Pinks/Alliance 21					14	0.1	
DKP					13	0.1	Steady
LKR					9	0.0	▼0.4
BüSo					8	0.0	Steady
German Conservative					6	0.0	
SGP					5	0.0	▼0.1
Informal votes		437			240		
Total valid votes		19,813			20,048		
Turnout		20,302	70.9	▲9,5			
SPD hold	Majority	1,216	6.1				

== See also ==
- Politics of Berlin
- House of Representatives of Berlin
