= Steglitz-Zehlendorf 4 =

State electoral district of Germany

- Electoral district for the Berlin House of Representatives
- Steglitz-Zehlendorf 4 in 2026
- District: Steglitz-Zehlendorf
- Electorate: 31,317 (2026)

Current electoral district
- Party: CDU
- Member: Cornelia Seibeld

Steglitz-Zehlendorf 4 is an electoral constituency (German: Wahlkreis) represented in the House of Representatives of Berlin. It elects one member via first-past-the-post voting.

== Geography ==
The constituency comprises the areas of Hildburghauser Straße, Oberhofer Platz, Thermometersiedlung and, Lippstädter Straße of the Lichterfelde district, entirely within the borough of Steglitz-Zehlendorf.

There were 31,317 eligible voters in 2026.

== Members ==
Election	Member	Party	%
1999	Michael Borgis	CDU	58.2
2001	Michael Borgis	CDU	38.9
2006	Cornelia Seibeld	CDU	40.5
2011	Cornelia Seibeld	CDU	43.3
2016	Cornelia Seibeld	CDU	32.3
2021	Cornelia Seibeld	CDU	31.7
2023	Cornelia Seibeld	CDU	41.9
2026	Cornelia Seibeld	CDU	32.7

== Election results ==
=== 2026 election ===
State election (2026): Steglitz-Zehlendorf 4
Notes:	Blue background denotes the winner of the electorate vote. Pink background denotes a candidate elected from their party list. Yellow background denotes an electorate win by a list member, or other incumbent. A ✓ or ✗ denotes status of any incumbent, win or lose respectively.						
Party	Candidate	Votes	%	±%	Party votes	%	±%
CDU	✓ Cornelia Seibeld	7,782	32.7	▼9.1	7,234	30.1	▼8.9
Greens	Klara Ruhl	4,126	17.3	▲1.6	3,419	14.2	▼0.6
SPD	Carolyn Macmillan	3,912	16.4	▼5.6	4,036	16.8	▼4.2
AfD	Hans-Jürgen Georgi	2,988	12.6	▲5.9	3,072	12.8	▲6.2
Left	Mathias Gruner	2,819	11.8	▲7.4	3,308	13.8	▲9.1
FDP	Mathia Specht-Habbel	797	3.3	▼2.0	916	3.8	▼3.1
BSW	Anja Wirbel	791	3.3		822	3.4	
Volt	Ole Jendis	590	2.5		517	2.2	▲1.5
Tierschutzpartei					440	1.8	▼0.2
PARTEI					103	0.4	▼0.5
PdF					64	0.3	
ÖDP					43	0.2	▲0.1
du.					16	0.1	▼0.1
DKP					11	0.0	Steady
SGP					6	0.0	Steady
Informal votes		444			242		
Total valid votes		23,805			24,007		
Turnout		24,249	77.4	▲9.1			
CDU hold	Majority	3,656	15.4	▼4.3			

=== 2023 repeat election ===
Changes denoted below for the 2023 election are compared to the 2016 election, as the 2021 election was declared invalid.

State election (2023): Steglitz-Zehlendorf 4
Notes:	Blue background denotes the winner of the electorate vote. Pink background denotes a candidate elected from their party list. Yellow background denotes an electorate win by a list member, or other incumbent. A ✓ or ✗ denotes status of any incumbent, win or lose respectively.						
Party	Candidate	Votes	%	±%	Party votes	%	±%
CDU	✓ Cornelia Seibeld	8,096	41.8	9.6	7,579	39.0	▲10.5
SPD	Carolyn Macmillan	4,274	22.1	▼2.3	4,075	21.0	▼0.3
Greens	Gülşah Bayar	3,038	15.7	▲1.5	2,882	14.8	▲0.7
AfD	Andreas Wild	1,294	6.7	▼5.9	1,278	6.6	▼6.1
FDP	Mathia Specht-Habbel	1,032	5.3	▼3.9	1,346	6.9	▼4.0
Left	Pia Imhof-Speckmann	851	4.4	▼1.0	905	4.7	▼1.6
Tierschutzpartei	Laura Höll	523	2.7		400	2.1	▲0.3
PARTEI					184	0.9	▲0.1
Volt					126	0.6	
FW	Felix Hartmann	132	0.7		53	0.3	
dieBasis	Elfi Boeckler	122	0.6		94	0.5	
The Grays					67	0.3	
Gray Panthers					66	0.3	▼0.6
Team Todenhöfer					63	0.3	
Pirates					56	0.3	▼1.0
Klimaliste					33	0.2	
Humanists					33	0.2	
Mieterpartei					28	0.1	
Verjüngungsforschung					25	0.1	▼0.3
du.					24	0.1	
ÖDP					18	0.1	
Bildet Berlin!					17	0.1	
NPD					13	0.1	▼0.2
DKP					12	0.1	Steady
LKR					9	0.0	▼0.3
The Pinks/Alliance 21					9	0.0	
SGP					6	0.0	Steady
Bergpartei, die ÜberPartei					6	0.0	
BüSo					5	0.0	▼0.1
Informal votes		162			133		
Total valid votes		19,362			19,412		
Turnout		19,555	68.3	▼4.5			
CDU hold	Majority	3,822	19.7				

=== 2021 election (annulled) ===
The election in 2021 was annulled and rerun in 2023.

State election (2021): Steglitz-Zehlendorf 4
Notes:	Blue background denotes the winner of the electorate vote. Pink background denotes a candidate elected from their party list. Yellow background denotes an electorate win by a list member, or other incumbent. A ✓ or ✗ denotes status of any incumbent, win or lose respectively.						
Party	Candidate	Votes	%	±%	Party votes	%	±%
CDU	✓ Cornelia Seibeld	6,178	31.7	▼0.6	6,444	28.3	▼0.3
SPD	Carolyn Macmillan	5,821	25.7	▲1.4	5,570	24.4	▲3.2
Greens	Gülşah Bayar	3,859	17.0	▲2.8	3,654	16.0	▲1.9
FDP	Mathia Specht-Habbel	1,913	8.4	▼0.8	2,306	10.1	▼0.8
AfD	Andreas Wild	1,415	6.2	▼6.3	1,441	6.3	▼6.3
Left	Pia Imhof-Speckmann	1,055	4.7	▼0.8	1,155	5.1	▼1.1
Tierschutzpartei	Laura Höll	712	3.1		416	1.8	Steady
dieBasis	Elfi Boeckler	376	1.7		281	1.2	
FW	Felix Hartmann	314	1.4		175	0.8	
PARTEI					265	1.2	▲0.3
Volt					178	0.8	
Team Todenhöfer					165	0.7	
The Grays					122	0.5	
Gray Panthers					103	0.5	▼0.4
APT					95	0.4	
Pirates					84	0.4	▼0.9
Klimaliste					55	0.2	
Verjüngungsforschung					44	0.2	▼0.2
Humanists					43	0.2	
du.					34	0.1	
ÖDP					33	0.1	
Bildet Berlin!					31	0.1	
Mieterpartei					30	0.1	
NPD					18	0.1	▼0.2
The Pinks/Alliance 21					15	0.1	
LKR					12	0.1	▼0.3
DKP					7	0.0	Steady
Bergpartei, die ÜberPartei					6	0.0	
BüSo					3	0.0	▼0.1
SGP					1	0.0	▼0.1
Informal votes		276			183		
Total valid votes		22,643			22,786		
Turnout		22,982	79.1	▲6.3			
CDU hold	Majority	1,357	8.7				

== See also ==
- Politics of Berlin
- House of Representatives of Berlin
