= Franziska Becker (politician) =

German politician (born 1967)

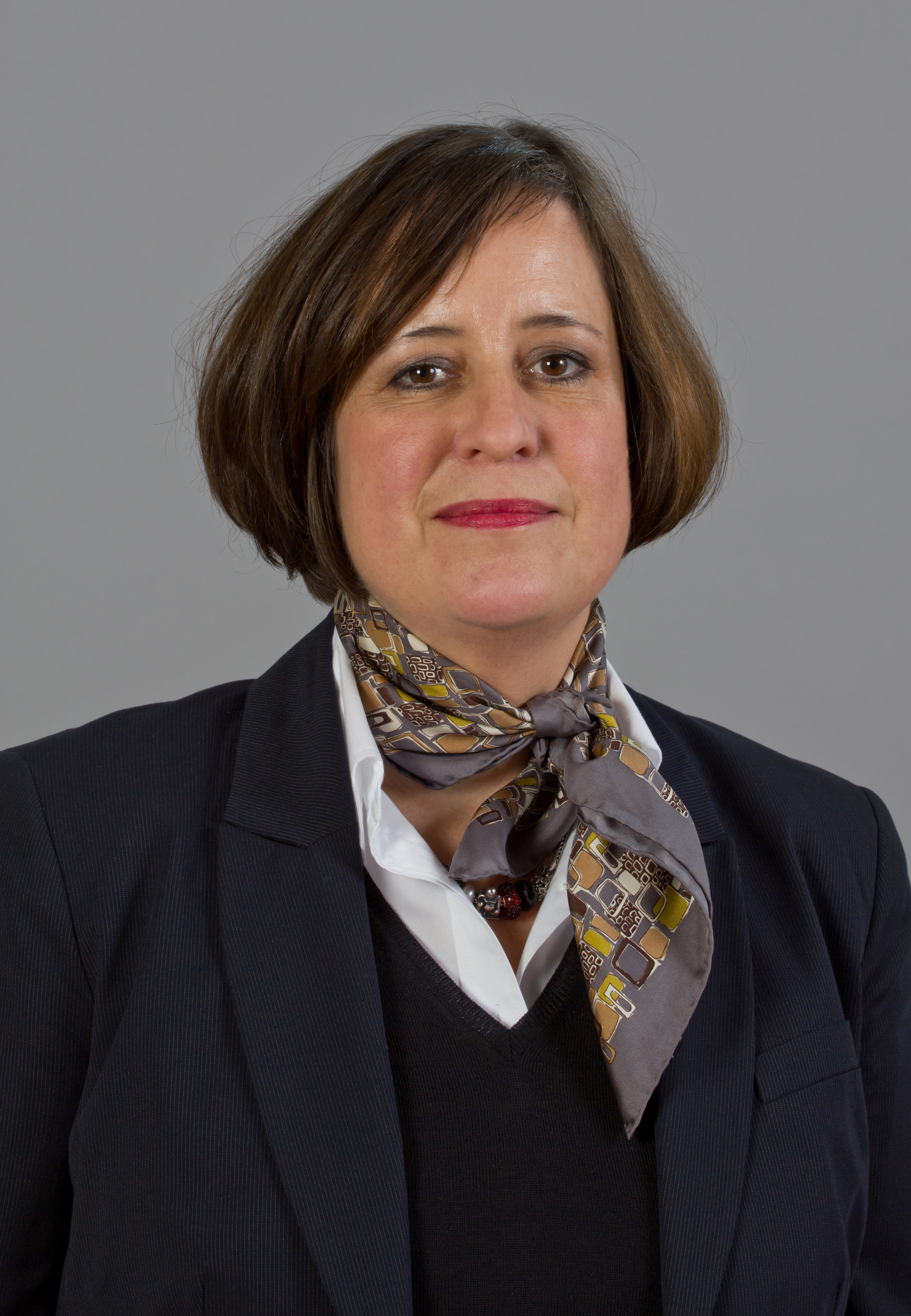
- Franziska Becker in 2013

Member of the Abgeordnetenhaus of Berlin
- In office 2011–2023

Personal details
- Born: 15 November 1967 (age 58) West Berlin, Germany
- Party: SPD
- Education: Free University of Berlin

Franziska Becker (born 15 November 1967) is a German politician from the Social Democratic Party of Germany (SPD). Since 2023, she has been State Secretary for Sport in the Berlin Senate Department for the Interior and Sport . Previously, she was a member of the Abgeordnetenhaus of Berlin from 2011 to 2023.

== Origin and profession ==
Franziska Becker was born and raised in Berlin-Charlottenburg and has lived in Wilmersdorf since 1998. After graduating from high school in 1988, she completed a dual vocational training program as an insurance clerk at Volksfürsorge Deutsche Lebensversicherung AG. In 1991, she began studying business administration at the Free University of Berlin, graduating in 1999 with a degree in business administration. From 1993 to 2005, Franziska Becker worked at the German Institute for Economic Research (DIW Berlin). Between 2006 and 2011, she served as managing director of the Systemic Society (Systemische Gesellschaft) in Berlin. She completed further professional development courses to become a public relations consultant (DAPR) and a systemic business coach (SG).

== Political career ==
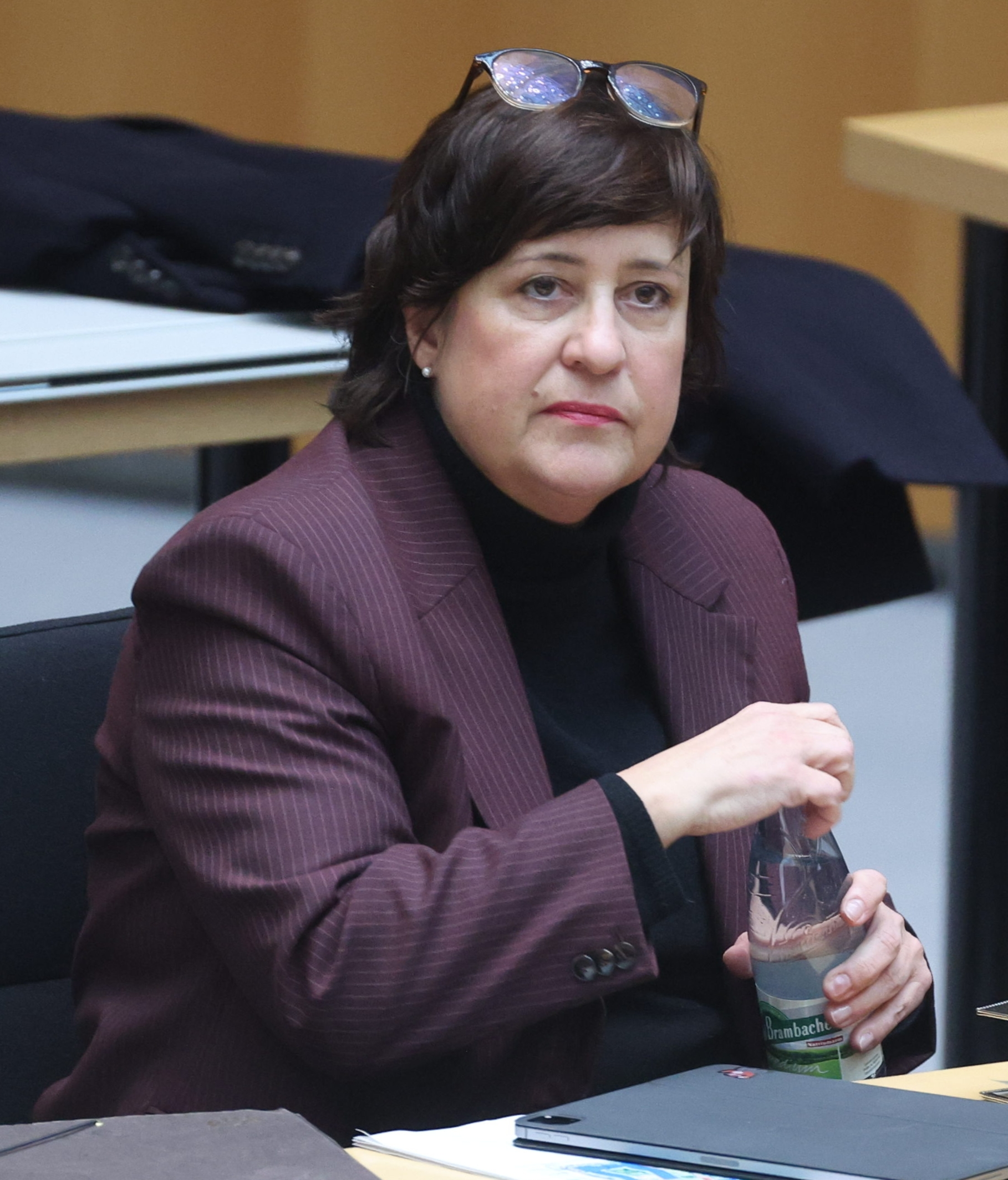
Franziska Becker (2024)

Franziska Becker has been a member of the SPD since 1993. She initially became involved with the Young Socialists (Jusos) and served as deputy state chair from 1994 to 1996. After several years as a member of the district and local party executive committees of the SPD's Charlottenburg-Wilmersdorf district association, Franziska Becker was nominated in 2011 as the SPD's direct candidate for the Charlottenburg-Wilmersdorf 6 constituency, which she won directly in the Berlin state elections of 2011 and 2016, with 33.1 percent and 30.0 percent, of the first-preference votes, respectively.

In the Abgeordnetenhaus of Berlin, Becker chaired the Main Committee (Budget and Finance) from November 2018. She was also a member of the Committee on Communication Technology and Data Protection, the Subcommittee on Budget Control, and the Subcommittee on Personnel and Administration (as spokesperson for the SPD parliamentary group). In addition to budget and financial policy, her political focus in the House of Representatives included personnel and administration, e-government (administrative modernization), and education and labor market policy. In December 2015, the SPD Charlottenburg-Wilmersdorf nominated Franziska Becker again as their direct candidate for constituency 6 Wilmersdorf for the election on 18 September 2016.

In February 2021, the district delegates' assembly of the SPD Charlottenburg-Wilmersdorf elected Franziska Becker for a third time as their direct candidate for the Charlottenburg-Wilmersdorf 6 constituency and also placed her first on the party list, thus making her the top candidate for the district SPD in the 2021 Berlin state election. She entered the House of Representatives via the party list. She also retained her seat in the repeat election in 2023.

On 7 November 2023, Becker was appointed State Secretary for Sport in the Berlin Senate Department for the Interior and Sport, succeeding Nicola Böcker-Giannini . As a result, she resigned her seat and Florian Dörstelmann took her place. Franziska Becker was the district chairwoman of the SPD Charlottenburg-Wilmersdorf from 2020 to 2022.

== Other Activities ==
For her reading series "Politics & Biography," Franziska Becker primarily invites Berlin-based authors to her constituency office to read from their own biographies or works they have written themselves. Guests have included Marianne Birthler, Horst Bosetzky, Wibke Bruhns, Inge Deutschkron, Gunter Hofmann, Jutta Rosenkranz, Rita Süssmuth, and the former Governing Mayor of Berlin, Walter Momper.

Franziska Becker is the chairwoman of the Förderverein Unternehmerinnen-Centrum West (UCW) in Wilmersdorf, a member of the Ver.di, Tennis Borussia Berlin (supervisory board member from 2016 to 2018) and the Bundesplatz Initiative. Commemoration and remembrance work is particularly important to Franziska Becker. She is the spokesperson for the jury of the youth media prize "Das Rote Tuch" (The Red Cloth). "Das Rote Tuch" is a non-partisan association of the same name that calls for action against discrimination of minorities, racism, and antisemitism, and established the youth media prize, which is awarded biennially by the SPD Charlottenburg-Wilmersdorf.

== See also ==
- List of members of the 19th Abgeordnetenhaus of Berlin (2021–2023)
- List of members of the 19th Abgeordnetenhaus of Berlin (2023–2026)
