= Aferdita Suka =

German politician

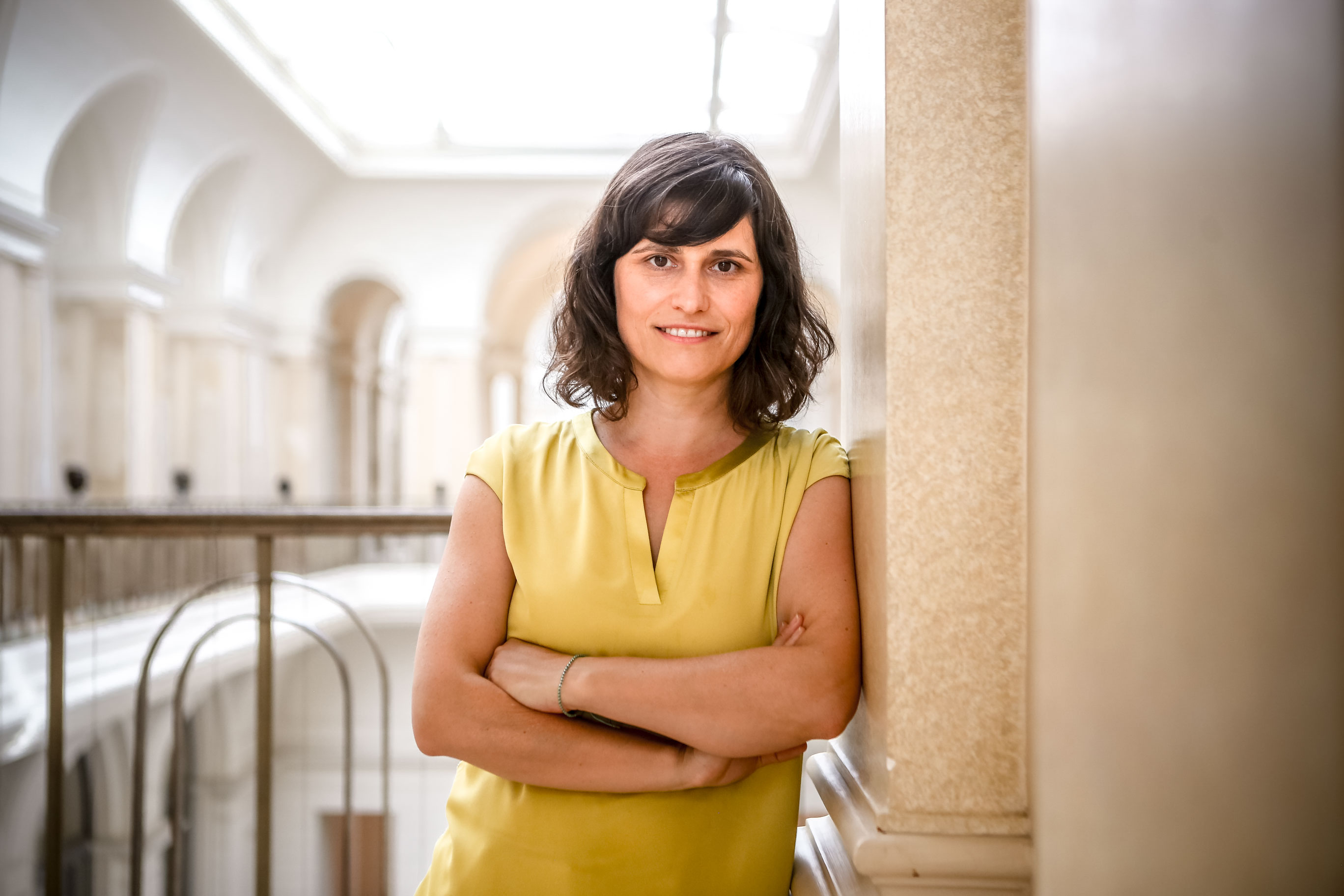
- Aferdita Suka in 2021

Member of the Abgeordnetenhaus of Berlin
- In office 2021–2023

Personal details
- Born: 22 June 1980 (age 46) Suva Reka, Kosovo (then Yugoslavia)
- Party: Alliance 90/The Greens
- Education: Humboldt University of Berlin
- Website: https://aferdita-suka.de/

Aferdita Suka (22 June 1980) is a German politician from the Alliance 90/The Greens. From 2021 to 2023 she was a member of the Abgeordnetenhaus of Berlin.

== Biography ==
=== Early life and education ===
Aferdita Suka was born and raised in Suhareka (Albanian: Bllacë-Suharekë ), Kosovo Province, then Yugoslavia, now the Republic of Kosovo. During the Yugoslav Wars, she fled to Germany with part of her family at the age of twelve and has lived in Berlin since 1992. After graduating from high school in 1999, she studied social sciences at Humboldt University of Berlin. She then worked as a consultant in the Senate Administration. Most recently, she worked freelance, including as a court interpreter.

=== Political career ===
Suka joined the Green Party (Alliance 90/The Greens) in 2010. She was elected to the Tempelhof-Schöneberg district assembly in the 2011 elections and re-elected in 2016. From 2011 to 2016, she was a member of the Green Party's parliamentary group executive committee in Tempelhof-Schöneberg. From 2016 to 2021 (the end of the legislative period), she chaired the Health Committee of the Tempelhof-Schöneberg district assembly and served as her parliamentary group's spokesperson on social and health policy. Her main focus was on affordable housing, health promotion, and long-term care. In 2015, she was awarded the Helene Weber Prize for her social policy commitment.

At the 2021 Berlin state election, the Green Party's state association nominated Suka for a direct mandate in the Tempelhof-Schöneberg 4 constituency and for 25th place on the state list. In the election, Suka won her direct mandate with 25.7 percent of the vote, the first time for the Greens, and entered the Berlin House of Representatives directly. In the repeat election in 2023, she lost her seat.

On December 6, 2025, Suka again ran for the Green Party nomination for the 2026 Berlin state election and won an internal party vote against a competitor. She was subsequently officially nominated by the Tempelhof-Schöneberg district association as the direct candidate for constituency 4 (Tempelhof).

=== Personal life ===
Suka is married and has a daughter.

In April 2021, Suka published an interview on the migration policy portal “Heimatkunde” of the Heinrich Böll Foundation, in which she discussed the recruitment strategies of political parties in Germany.

Since the end of August 2024, she has been working as a research assistant in the research project “SIMPLE – Language Opens Doors” at Charité in Berlin, which deals with the use of artificial intelligence to overcome language barriers.

== See also ==
- List of members of the 19th Abgeordnetenhaus of Berlin (2021–2023)
