= Maren Jasper-Winter =

German politician (born 1977)

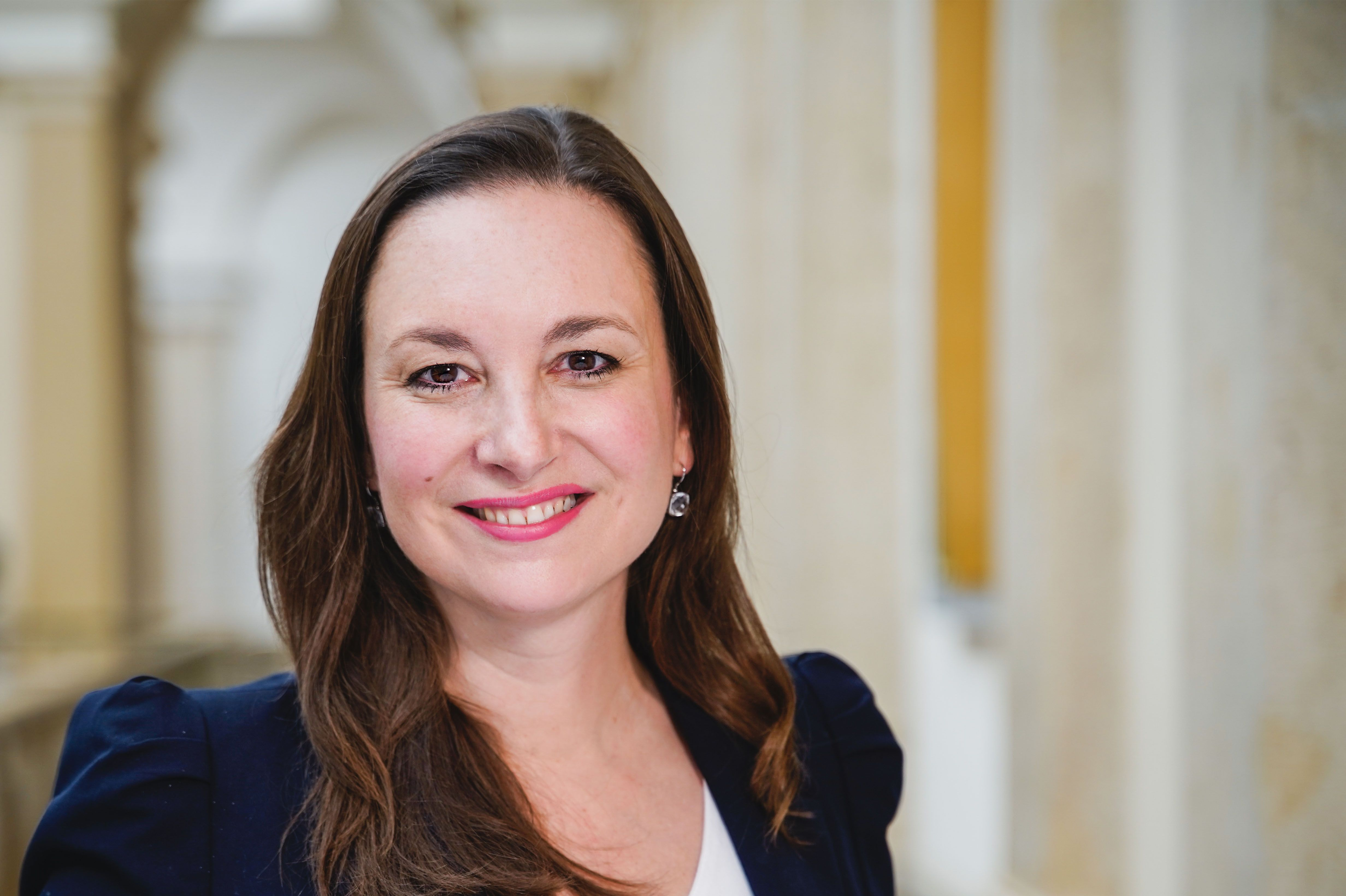
- Jasper-Winter in 2021

Member of the Abgeordnetenhaus of Berlin
- In office 27 October 2016 – 16 March 2023
- Constituency: Mitte

Personal details
- Born: 30 March 1977 (age 49) Münster
- Party: Free Democratic Party (since 1999)

Maren Jasper-Winter (born 30 March 1977 in Münster) is a German politician. From 2016 to 2023, she was a member of the Abgeordnetenhaus of Berlin. She has served as chairwoman of the Free Democratic Party in Mitte since 2008.
