= Tobias Bauschke =

German politician (born 1987)

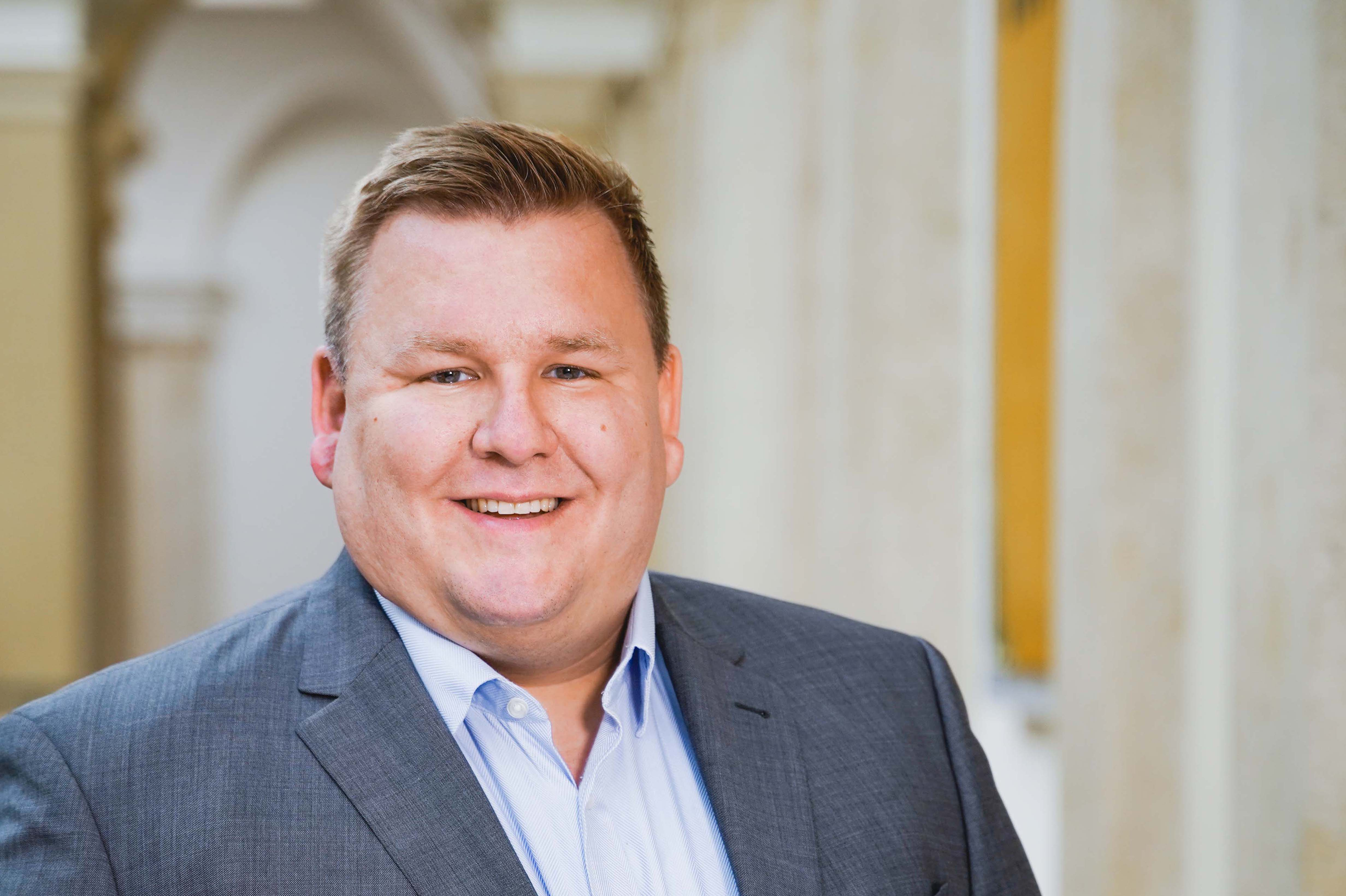
German politician

Tobias Bauschke (born 1987) is a German politician for the FDP and since 2021 member of the Abgeordnetenhaus of Berlin, the state parliament of Berlin.

== Politics ==
Bauschke was born in the Bavarian town of Deggendorf and became a member of the Abgeordnetenhaus in 2021.
