= Niklas Schenker =

German politician (born 1993)

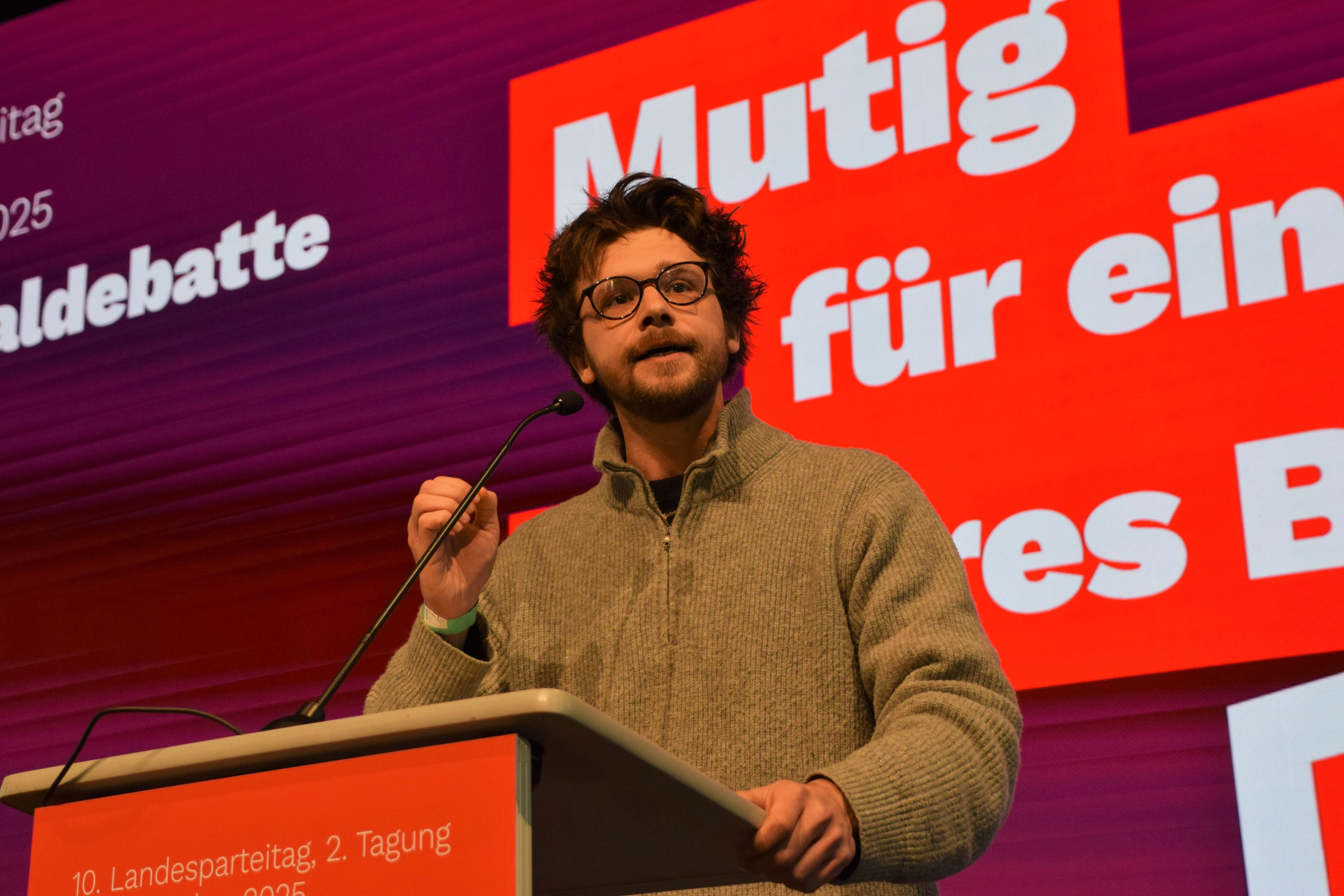
- Schenker in 2025

Member of the Abgeordnetenhaus of Berlin
- Incumbent
- Assumed office 4 November 2021

Personal details
- Born: 1993 (age 32–33) Berlin, Germany
- Party: Die Linke

Niklas Schenker (born 1993 in Berlin) is a German political scientist and politician from Die Linke. He has been a member of the Berlin House of Representatives since 2021.

== Life ==
Niklas Schenker was born and grew up in Charlottenburg-Wilmersdorf. He completed a bachelor's degree in social sciences at the Humboldt University of Berlin and then completed a master's degree in political science at the Free University of Berlin. He worked as a research assistant for Member of the German Bundestag Caren Lay.

== Political career ==
Schenker joined Die Linke in 2013. In the district assembly of the Charlottenburg-Wilmersdorf district, he served as parliamentary group leader of his party from October 2016 to October 2021. In the 2021 Berlin state election, he received a mandate via his party's state list. He was able to defend his seat in the House of Representatives in the repeat election in 2023.

In the 2021-2026 legislative period, Schenker is the spokesman for rents, housing, public housing and housing subsidies, cycling and walking, and club culture for the Left Party as well as a member of the urban development, building and housing, mobility, culture and Europe committees and the subcommittee for participation management Investment controlling for construction investments.

In the 2025 German federal election, he was the Die Linke candidate in Berlin-Charlottenburg-Wilmersdorf but was not elected.

== Political positions ==
Schenker supports the Deutsche Wohnen & Co. enteignen and is committed to its rapid implementation following the successful referendum. In an interview with the magazine Jacobin, he described the Berlin rent movement as the “most important coalition partner” in the red-green-red coalition. He considers squatting to be a legitimate means of civil disobedience and calls for an end to the Berliner Linie policy.

Schenker calls for further development of City West oriented towards the common good and speaks out against the construction of further high-rise buildings.

== See also ==
- List of members of the 19th Abgeordnetenhaus of Berlin (2021–2023)
- List of members of the 19th Abgeordnetenhaus of Berlin (2023–2026)
