= Louis Krüger =

German politician (born 1996)

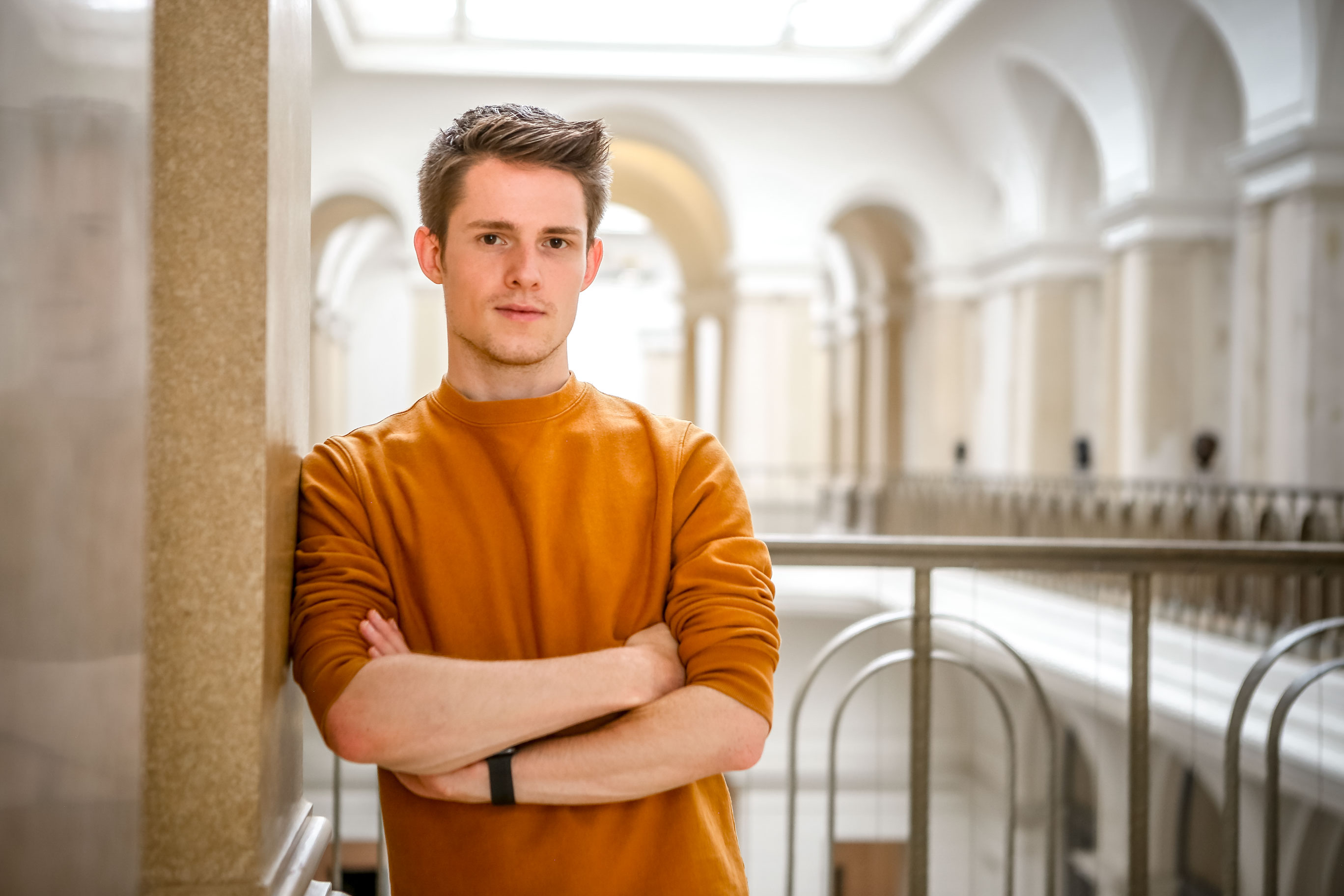
- Louis-Krüger in 2021

Member of the Abgeordnetenhaus of Berlin
- Incumbent
- Assumed office 2021
- Constituency: Pankow 5

Personal details
- Born: 5 June 1996 (age 29) Berlin, Germany
- Party: Alliance 90/The Greens
- Occupation: Politician

Louis Krüger (born 5 June 1996 in Pankow) is a German teacher and politician from Alliance 90/The Greens. He was elected to the Abgeordnetenhaus of Berlin in Pankow 5 at the 2021 Berlin state election. He is the second-youngest member of the 19th Abgeordnetenhaus of Berlin. Krüger is the school policy spokesman for the Greens in the House of Representatives and a member of the Committee on Education, Youth and Family.

== Education and career ==
Krüger was educated at the Werner-von-Siemens-Gymnasium in Berlin before completing a master of education at Humboldt University of Berlin.

== Personal life ==
Krüger is gay and married his partner in 2023.
