= Bahar Haghanipour =

German politician (born 1984)

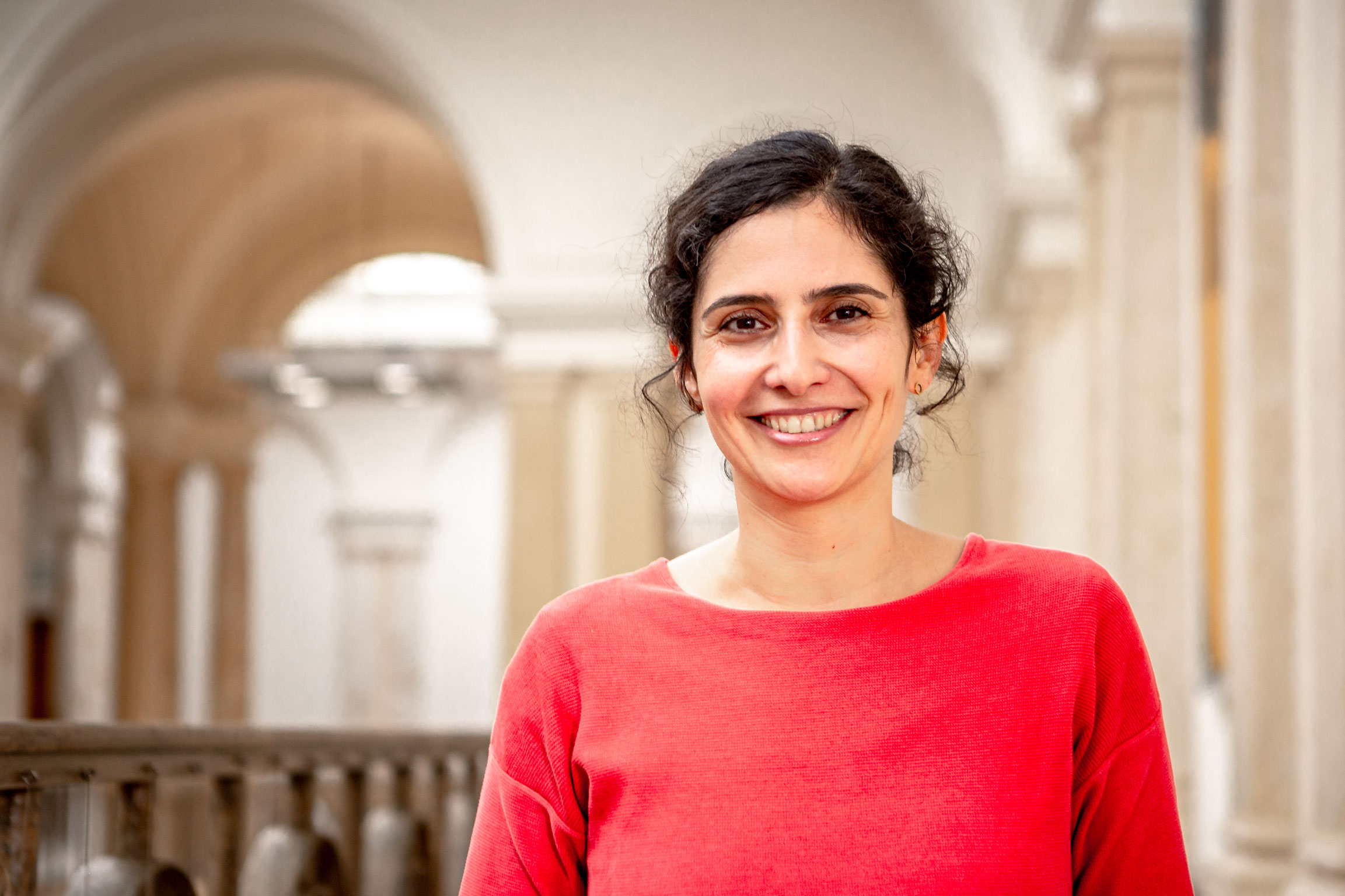
- Haghanipour in 2021

Vice President of the Abgeordnetenhaus of Berlin
- Incumbent
- Assumed office 4 November 2021 Serving with Cornelia Seibeld
- President: Dennis Buchner

Member of the Abgeordnetenhaus of Berlin
- Incumbent
- Assumed office 4 November 2021

Personal details
- Born: Bahar Haghanipour; 1984 (age 41–42) Tehran, Iran
- Party: Alliance 90/The Greens
- Education: Ruhr University Bochum

Bahar Haghanipour (born 1984) is a German social scientist and politician of Alliance 90/The Greens. Since 2021, she has been Vice President of the Abgeordnetenhaus of Berlin. She has been a member of the Abgeordnetenhaus since 2021.

== Education and career ==
Haghanipour was born in Tehran in 1984. She grew up in Berlin, where she graduated from secondary school in 2003. She then studied education as well as psychology and anthropology at the Ruhr University Bochum until 2009. In 2013, she completed her doctorate in sociology with the thesis Mentoring as gender-appropriate personnel development. In her dissertation, she focused on the topic of mentoring, as she does in her daily work, and reviewed the effectiveness and limitations of mentoring as gender-appropriate personnel development.

Haghanipour began working at the Technical University of Dortmund in 2009 as a manager for mentoring programs for girls and women in STEM subjects. She moved to Berlin in February 2015, where worked as a women's policy advisor in the office of Ulle Schauws. In July 2017, she began working at the German Women's Council, where she initially worked as a consultant. In 2020 she became manager for the lobbying division and consultant for national gender equality policy, focusing on gender-equitable federal budgets and gender equality policy structures.

== Political career ==
Haghanipour joined The Greens and the Green Youth in 2009. She became involved in local politics in Bochum, as spokesperson for the local branch of the Green Youth from 2009 to 2010 and a member of the Women's Advisory Council. From 2010 to 2013, she was a delegate in the Women's Council of North Rhine-Westphalia. From 2014 to 2018 and again since 2020, she has been co-spokesperson of the party's state working group Women* and Gender.

In 2021, Haghanipour was nominated as direct candidate for the Neukölln 4 constituency in the 2021 Berlin state election. She was also elected to third place on the Greens' state list. She placed fourth with 6.7% of the vote in Neukölln 4 but was elected to the Abgeordnetenhaus on the state list.

In the constituent session on 4 November, Haghanipour was elected one of two Vice Presidents of the Abgeordnetenhaus.
