= Tommy Tabor =

German politician (born 1982)

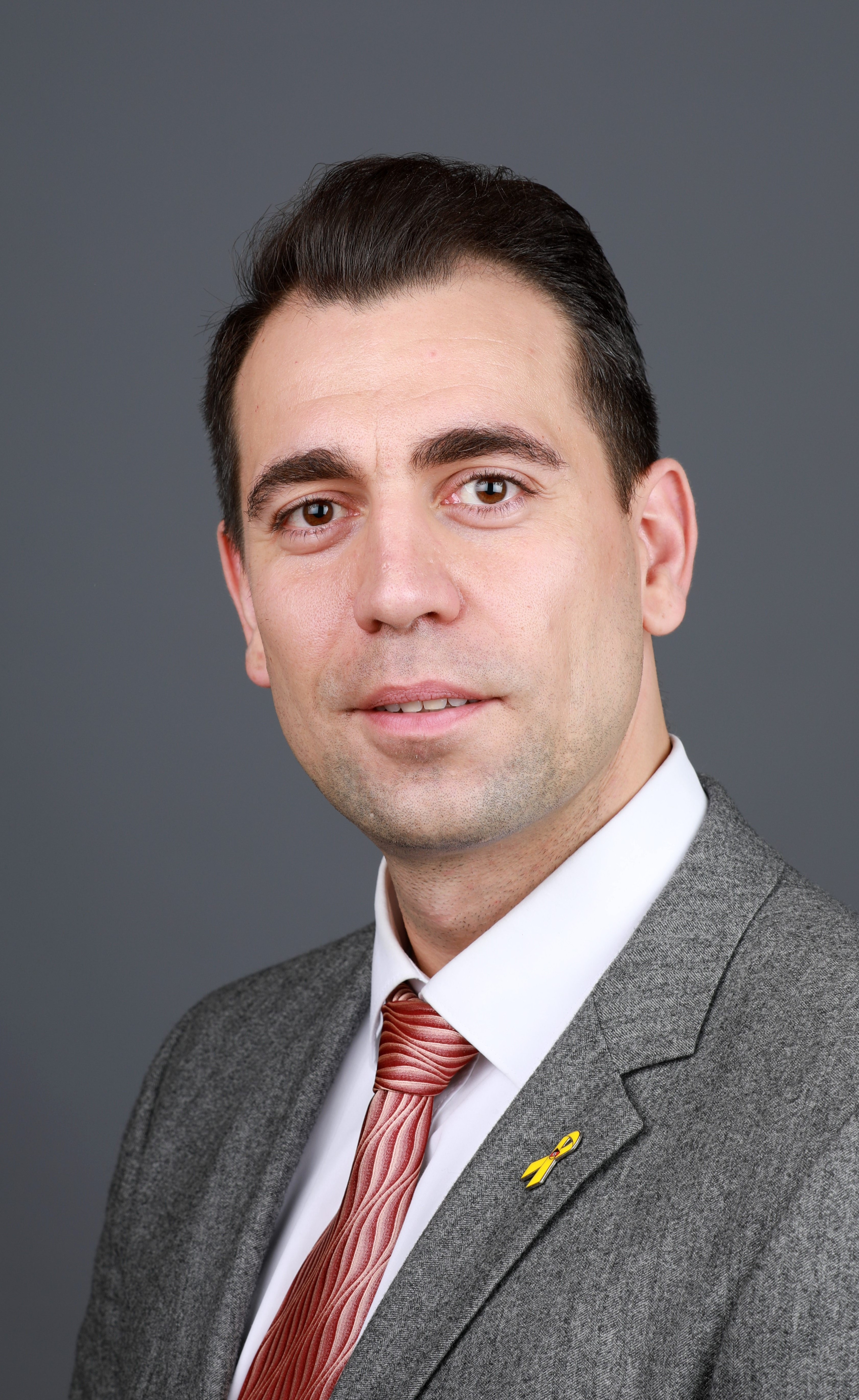
- Tabor in 2017

Member of the Berlin House of Representatives
- Incumbent
- Assumed office 25 October 2017
- Preceded by: Gottfried Curio

Personal details
- Born: 1982 (age 43–44)
- Party: Alternative for Germany (since 2014)

Tommy Tabor (born 1982) is a German politician serving as a member of the Berlin House of Representatives since 2017. He is the treasurer of the Alternative for Germany in Spandau.
