= Stefanie Bung =

German politician (born 1978)

Member of the Abgeordnetenhaus of Berlin
- Incumbent
- Assumed office 4 November 2021
- In office 26 October 2006 – 27 October 2011

Personal details
- Born: 9 February 1978 (age 48) Berlin
- Party: Christian Democratic Union (since 1999)

Stefanie Bung (born 9 February 1978) is a German politician. She has been a member of the Abgeordnetenhaus of Berlin since 2021, having previously served from 2006 to 2011. She has served as chairwoman of the Christian Democratic Union in Schmargendorf since 2005.
