= Mathias Schulz =

German politician (born 1985)

Member of the Abgeordnetenhaus of Berlin
- Incumbent
- Assumed office 4 November 2021
- Constituency: Mitte

Personal details
- Born: 12 June 1985 (age 40)
- Party: Social Democratic Party (since 2006)

Mathias Schulz (born 12 June 1985) is a German politician serving as a member of the Abgeordnetenhaus of Berlin since 2021. From 2012 to 2016, he served as chairman of Jusos in Mitte.
