= Steffen Zillich =

German politician (born 1971)

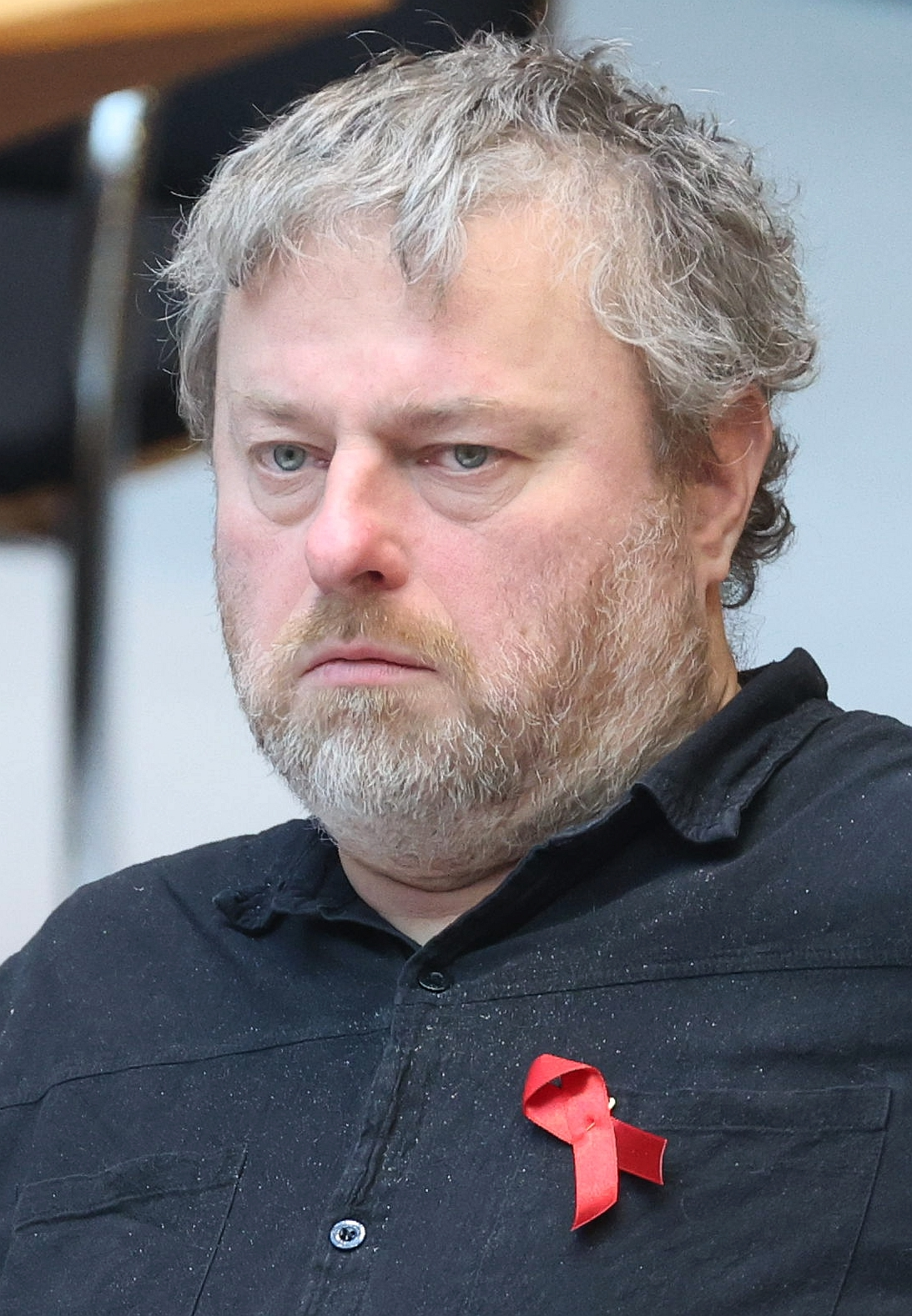
Steffen Zillich in 2024

Steffen Zillich (born 16 July 1971 in Berlin) is a German politician for The Left and since 2016 member of the Abgeordnetenhaus of Berlin, the state parliament of Berlin.

== Politics ==
Zillich was born in Berlin and studied law for eight years, then become a member of the Abgeordnetenhaus in 2016.
