= Gunnar Lindemann =

German politician (born 1970)

- Lindemann in 2026

Member of the Abgeordnetenhaus of Berlin
- Incumbent
- Assumed office 27 October 2016
- Preceded by: Wolfgang Brauer
- Constituency: Marzahn-Hellersdorf 1

Personal details
- Born: 25 August 1970 (age 56) Wuppertal
- Party: Alternative for Germany (since 2015)

Gunnar Lindemann (born 25 August 1970 in Wuppertal) is a German politician serving as a member of the Abgeordnetenhaus of Berlin since 2016. He is the migration policy spokesperson of the Alternative for Germany group in the Abgeordnetenhaus.
