= Niklas Schrader =

German politician (born 1981)

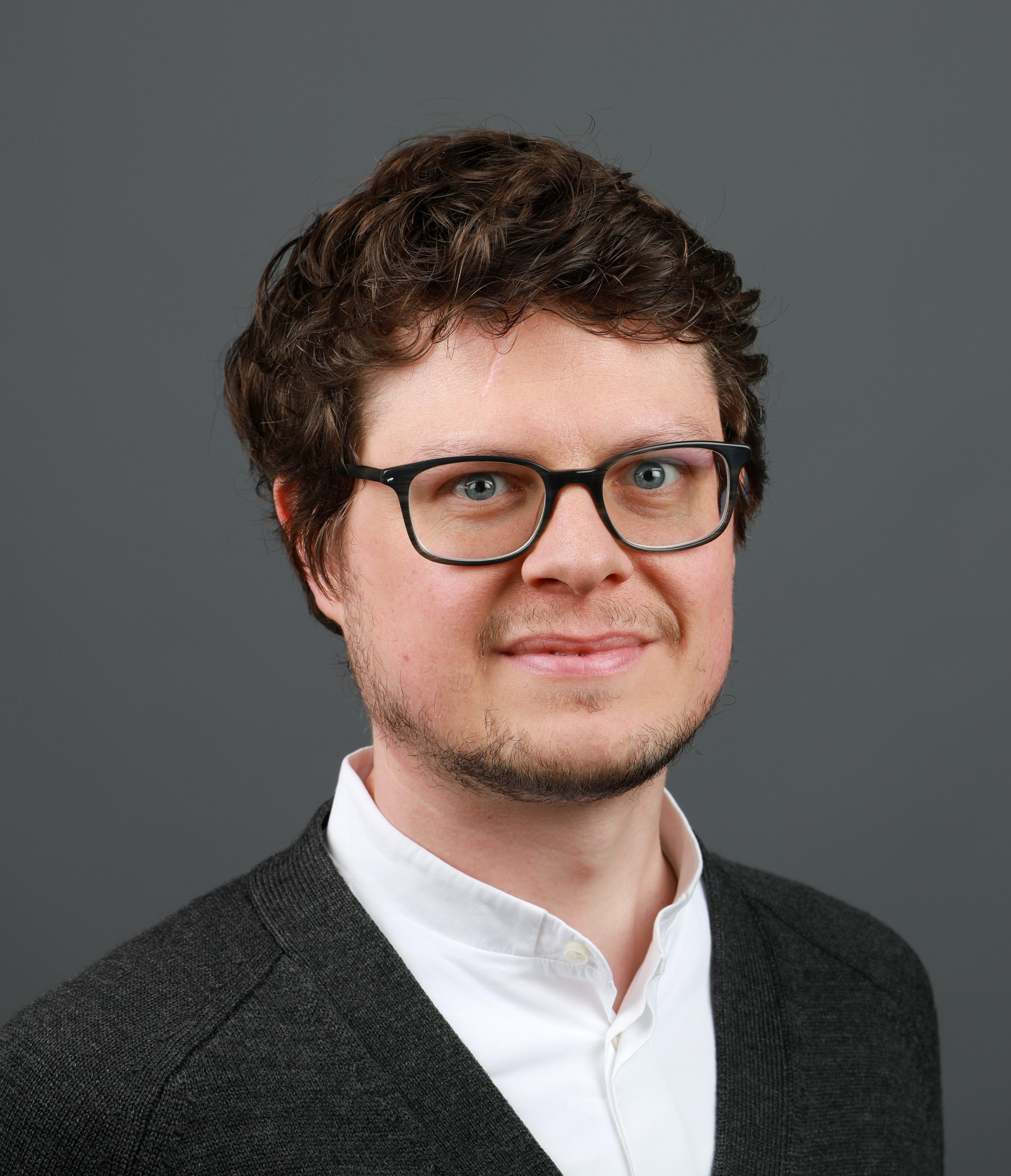
- Schrader in 2017

Member of the Abgeordnetenhaus of Berlin
- Incumbent
- Assumed office 27 October 2016

Personal details
- Born: 25 October 1981 (age 44) Berlin
- Party: Die Linke

Niklas Schrader (born 25 October 1981 in Berlin) is a German politician serving as a member of the Abgeordnetenhaus of Berlin since 2016. He has served as chief whip of Die Linke since 2024.
