= Lars Rauchfuß =

German politician (born 1986)

Member of the Abgeordnetenhaus of Berlin
- Incumbent
- Assumed office 4 November 2021
- Constituency: Tempelhof-Schöneberg

Personal details
- Born: 1986 (age 39–40)
- Party: Social Democratic Party (since 2005)

Lars Rauchfuß (born 1986) is a German politician serving as a member of the Abgeordnetenhaus of Berlin since 2021. He has served as chairman of the Social Democratic Party in Tempelhof-Schöneberg since 2018.
