= Tamara Lüdke =

German politician (born 1991)

Member of the Abgeordnetenhaus of Berlin
- Incumbent
- Assumed office 4 November 2021

Personal details
- Born: 1991 (age 34–35) Munich
- Party: Social Democratic Party (since 2014)

Tamara Lüdke (born 1991 in Munich) is a German politician serving as a member of the Abgeordnetenhaus of Berlin since 2021. She has served as co-chair of the Social Democratic Party in Lichtenberg since 2022.
