= Torsten Schneider =

German politician (born 1969)

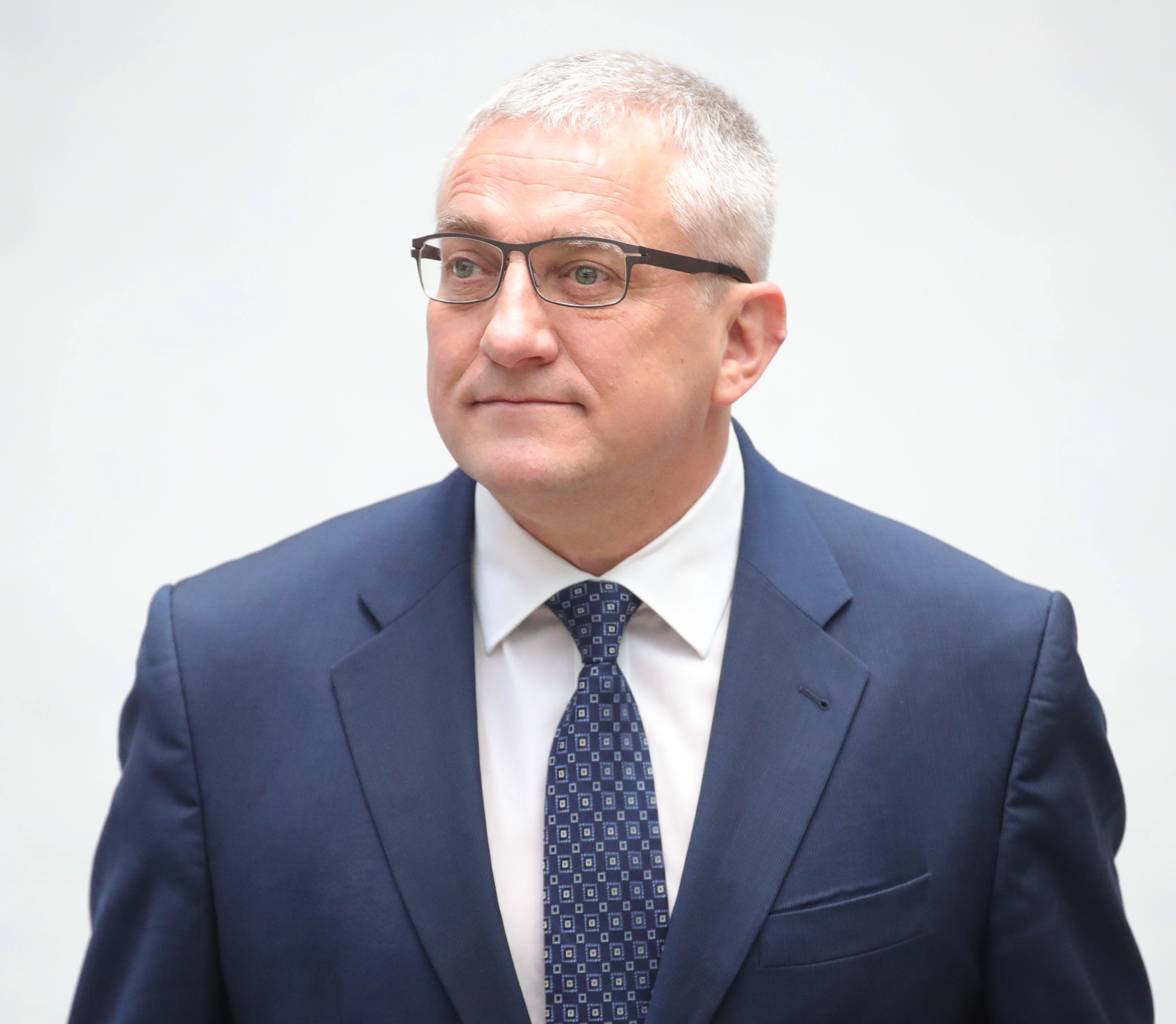
- Schneider in 2023

Member of the Abgeordnetenhaus of Berlin
- Incumbent
- Assumed office 27 December 2021
- Preceded by: Tino Schopf
- In office 26 October 2006 – 4 November 2021

Personal details
- Born: 24 January 1969 (age 57)
- Party: Social Democratic Party

Torsten Schneider (born 24 January 1969) is a German politician. He has been a member of the Abgeordnetenhaus of Berlin since 2021, having previously served from 2006 to 2021. He has served as chief whip of the Social Democratic Party since 2022.
