= Jian Omar =

German politician

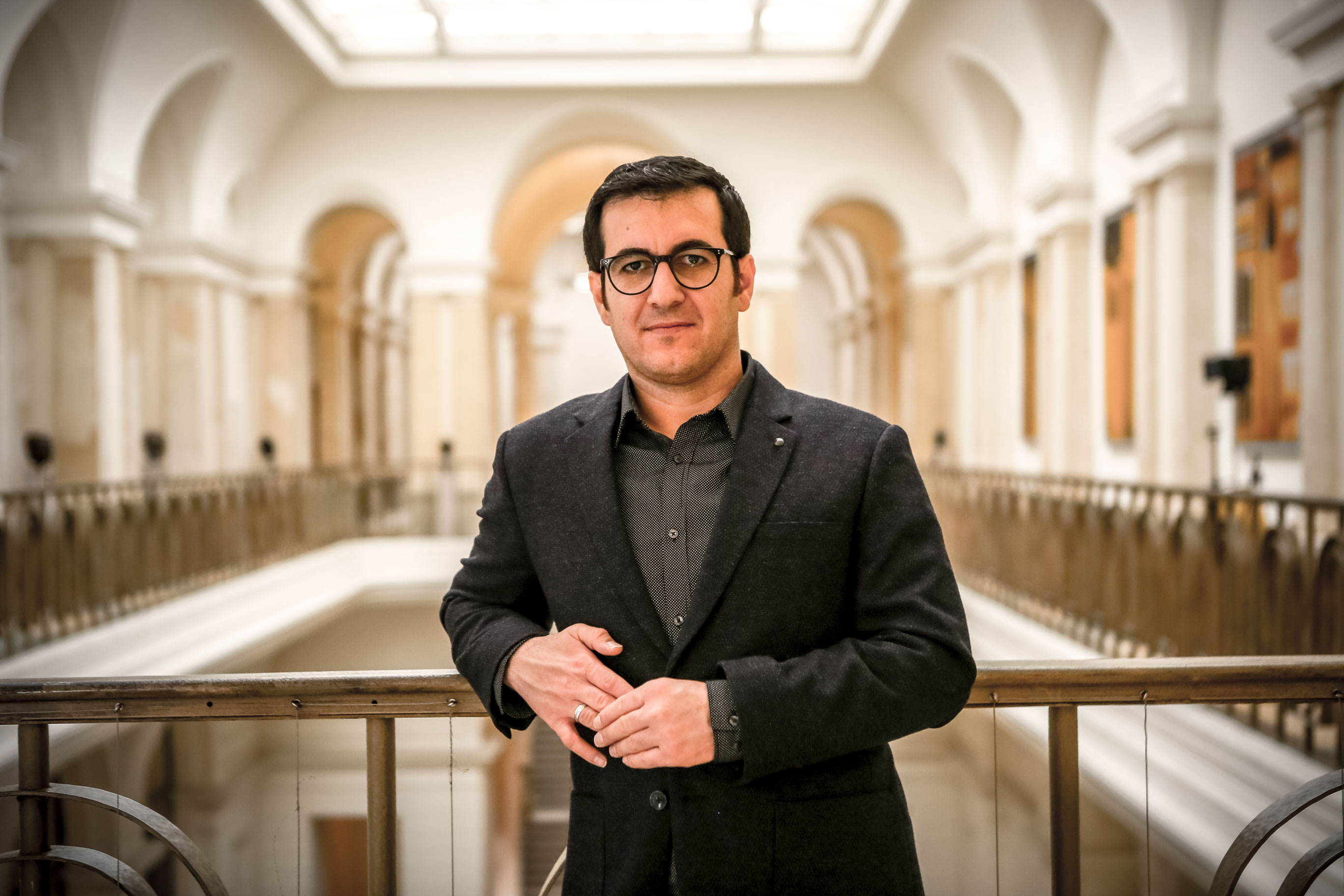

Member of the Abgeordnetenhaus of Berlin
- Preceded by: Thomas Isenberg
- Constituency: Mitte 3

Personal details
- Born: 1985 (age 40–41) Qamishli, Syria
- Party: Alliance 90/The Greens
- Occupation: Politician

Jian Omar (Arabic: جيان عمر; born 1985) is a German politician currently serving as Member of the Abgeordnetenhaus of Berlin representing Mitte 3 for Alliance 90/The Greens.

== Personal life and education ==
Omar is of Kurdish descent and was born in the city of Qamishli in northern Syria in 1985. He moved to Germany in 2005 to study and was later granted political asylum after the Syrian government refused to renew his passport.

Omar studied political science at the Free University of Berlin.

== Career ==
Omar was first elected to the Abgeordnetenhaus of Berlin in 2021, defeating the SPD for the first time in the seat of Mitte 3.

Omar is serving as spokesperson for the Green group on migration, refugees and public participation.

Following the outbreak of the Gaza war Omar's constituency office was repeatedly attacked by vandals, with Omar speaking to Reuters about his experience with rising hostility to Muslims in Europe.
