= Oberschule zum Dom =

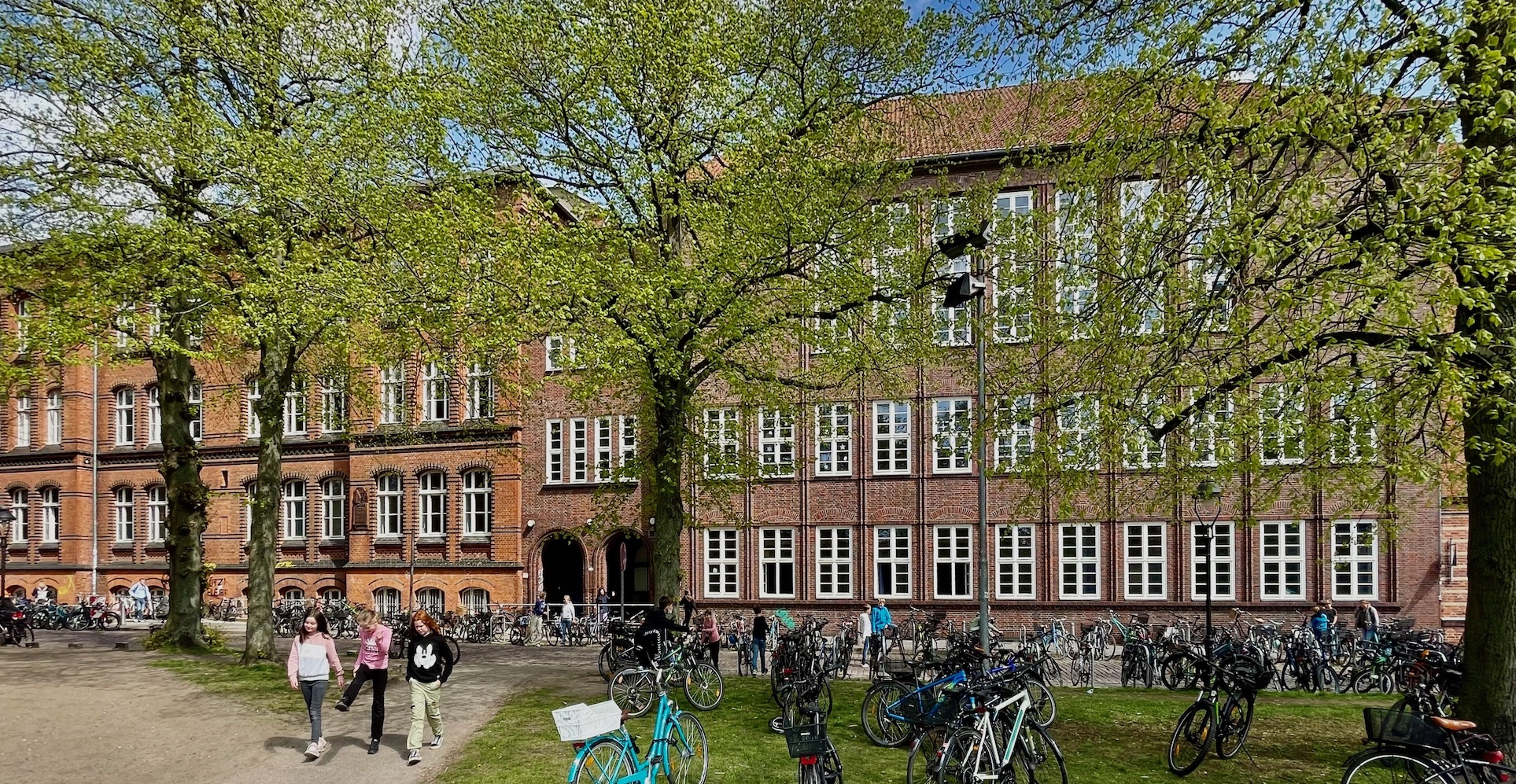

Location
- Lübeck, Schleswig-Holstein, Germany
- Coordinates: 53°51′40″N 10°41′15″E

Information
- Type: Public
- Established: 1905
- Colors: Black and red
- Website: www.ozd-luebeck.de

The Oberschule zum Dom, a grammar school in Lübeck and the Schleswig-Holstein area of Germany was founded in 1905 during the final years of the German Empire under Kaiser Wilhelm II. The school survived the bombing carried out on the city of Lübeck by the Royal Air Force during the second world war.

The School has long been a Gymnasium. It ranks in the top three schools in Lübeck.

== Location ==
The Oberschule zum Dom (OzD) is a grammar school in Lübeck, Northern Germany, located about 60 km (37 mi) from Hamburg and right next to the Baltic Sea. The OzD is opposited next to the Lübeck Cathedral (Dom), this provides it with a very central location within the city. Transport links are very good, being conveniently situated just 75m away from the Fegefeuer bus stop (Haltestelle) which is serviced by the Lübeck bus company with routes to all the major suburbs of the city and some nearby villages. This provides the school with the ability to accept students not solely from the city but also from slightly further a field.
