= Dennis Buchner =

German politician (born 1977)

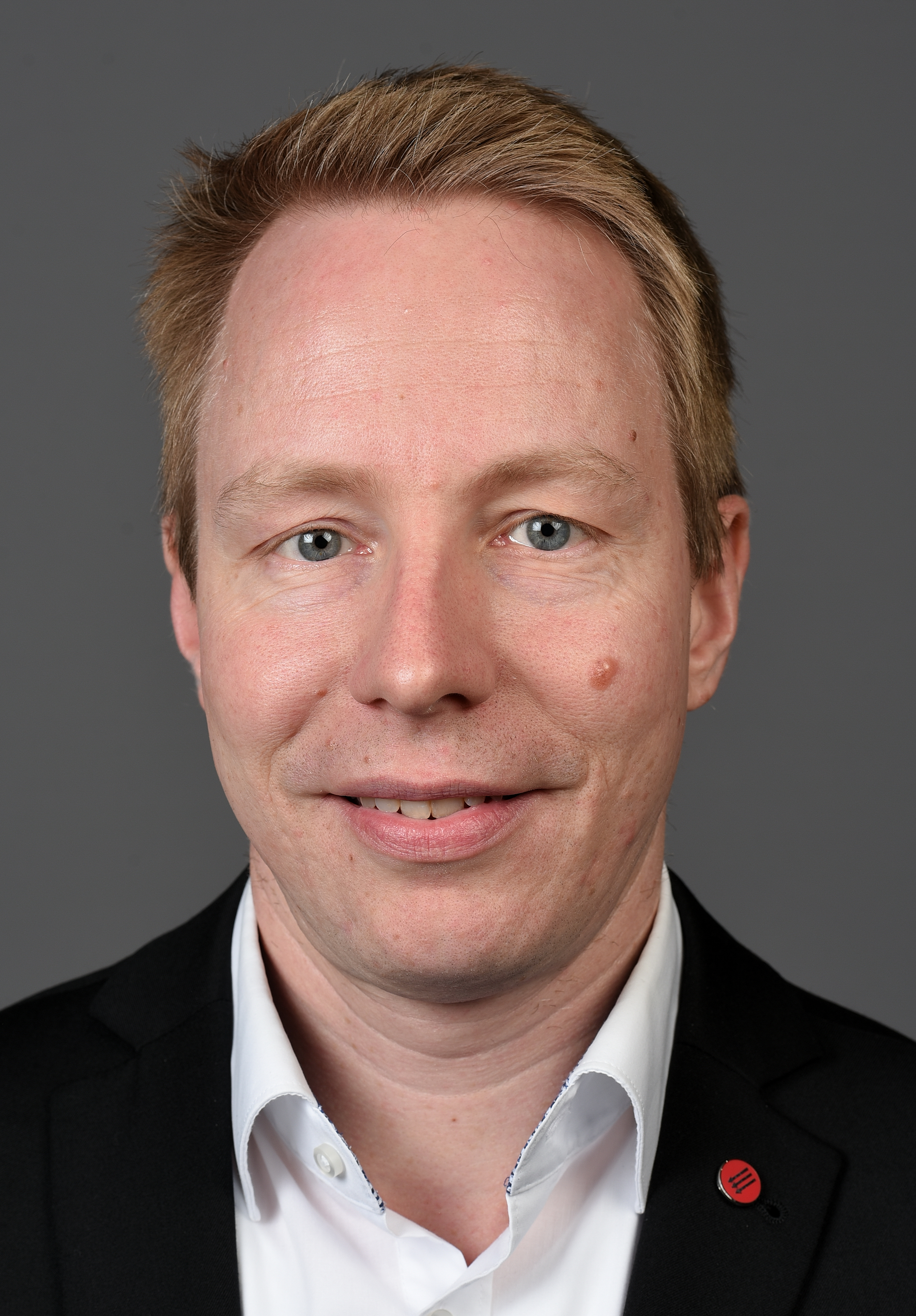
- Buchner in 2017

President of the Abgeordnetenhaus of Berlin
- In office 4 November 2021 – 16 March 2023
- Preceded by: Ralf Wieland
- Succeeded by: Cornelia Seibeld

Member of the Abgeordnetenhaus of Berlin
- Incumbent
- Assumed office 27 October 2011

Personal details
- Born: Dennis Buchner; 31 March 1977 (age 49) Lübeck, Schleswig-Holstein, West Germany
- Party: SPD
- Education: University of Bonn; University of Potsdam

Dennis Buchner (born 31 March 1977) is a German politician of the Social Democratic Party (SPD) who was serving as President of the Abgeordnetenhaus of Berlin from 2021 to 2023. He has been a member of the Abgeordnetenhaus since 2011.

== Life and education ==
Buchner was born in Lübeck, where he earned his Abitur form the Oberschule zum Dom. He completed civilian service at the health clinic in Bad Schwartau in 1996, and worked as a supermarket cashier before moving to Bonn in 1998 to study political science, sociology and modern history at the University of Bonn. After beginning work with the SPD in 2002, he moved to Berlin and resumed his studies part-time at the University of Potsdam. He graduated in 2005 with a degree in political science.

== Political career ==
Buchner joined the Social Democratic Party in 1998. From 2000 to 2002, he worked as a student assistant for Bernhard von Grünberg, an SPD member of the Landtag of North Rhine-Westphalia. He then worked for the federal SPD executive, including as office manager for deputy chairwoman Bärbel Dieckmann. From 2009 to 2010 he was head of department for the SPD in North Rhine-Westphalia. In the 2011 Saxony-Anhalt state election, Buchner was campaign manager for the SPD. He then became office manager for SPD federal director Astrid Klug from 2011 to 2012.

Buchner was chairman of the SPD association in the Berlin neighbourhood of Weissensee from 2004 to 2020. From 2014 to 2016, he was state director of the Berlin SPD. He was elected deputy chairman of the Pankow branch of the SPD in 2014, and in 2020 became chairman.

He was elected to the Abgeordnetenhaus of Berlin in the 2011 Berlin state election, winning the constituency of Pankow 4. He became a member of the Committee for Education, Youth and Family and the Committee for Sport, as well as the SPD's spokesman for sport. In 2012 he became an assessor in the presidium of the Abgeordnetenhaus. From 2016 to 2019 he was also a member of the Committee and Science and Research, and from 2019 to 2021 a member of the Committee for Europe, Federal Affairs, and Media. He was re-elected in Pankow 4 in the 2016 and 2021 state elections.

After the 2021 election, Buchner was elected President of the Abgeordnetenhaus. In his inaugural speech, he called for greater influence for women and youth in politics, and the lowering of the voting age from 18 to 16 years. He subsequently gave up all of his committee memberships except the Sport Committee. In 2022, he joined the Committee for Constitutional and Legal Affairs, Rules of Procedure, and Anti-Discrimination.
