= Cornelia Seibeld =

German politician

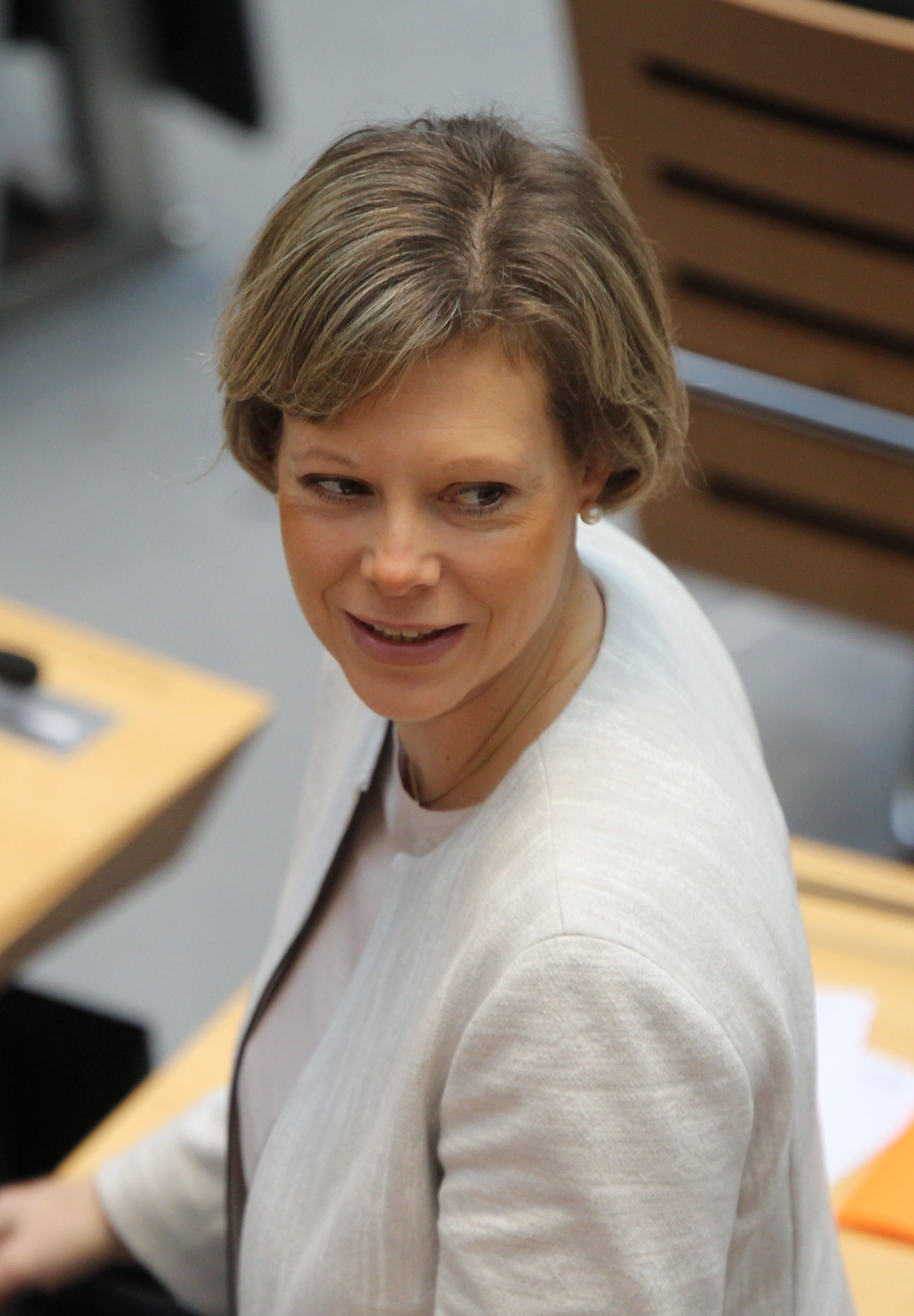
- Seibeld in 2016

President of the Abgeordnetenhaus of Berlin
- In office 16 March 2023 – 29 October 2026
- Preceded by: Dennis Buchner
- Succeeded by: Hendrikje Klein

Vice President of the Abgeordnetenhaus of Berlin
- Incumbent
- Assumed office 29 October 2026
- President: Hendrikje Klein
- Preceded by: Dennis Buchner
- In office 28 October 2016 – 16 March 2023 Serving with Manuela Schmidt (until Nov 2021) and Bahar Haghanipour (from Nov 2021)
- President: Dennis Buchner
- Preceded by: Andreas Gram
- Succeeded by: Dennis Buchner

Member of the Abgeordnetenhaus of Berlin
- Incumbent
- Assumed office 26 October 2006

Personal details
- Born: Cornelia Seibeld; 1974 (age 51–52) West Berlin
- Party: CDU
- Education: Free University of Berlin

Cornelia Seibeld (born 1974) is a German politician of the Christian Democratic Union (CDU). From 2023 to 2026, she served as the president of the Abgeordnetenhaus of Berlin, having previously served as vice-president from 2016-2023, a position she holds again since October 2026. She has been a member of the Abgeordnetenhaus since 2006.

== Life and education ==
Seibeld grew up in the West Berlin neighbourhood of Schöneberg and attended the Barnim and Fläming elementary schools. She graduated from the Walter-Rathenau-Gymnasium in 1994. Afterwards she studied law at the Free University of Berlin until 1999 and, after completing her law examinations in 1999 and 2001, began working as a lawyer in 2002. She specialises in construction and architecture. She has a son with fellow CDU politician Sven Rissmann.

== Political career ==
Seibeld joined the CDU and the Steglitz-Zehlendorf branch of the Young Union in 1996. In 2005, she became deputy chair of the Steglitz-Zehlendorf CDU. She was also previously secretary of the municipal CDU associations in Wannsee and Lilienthal.

Seibeld was elected to the Abgeordnetenhaus of Berlin in the 2006 Berlin state election, winning the constituency of Steglitz-Zehlendorf 4. In the 2006–2011 term, she was CDU spokeswoman for legal policy. From 2010–11, she was also deputy leader of the CDU parliamentary group. She was re-elected in 2011 and became spokeswoman for religious policy in 2013. She was also a member of the Committee for the Constitution, Legal Affairs, Consumer Protection, and Rules of Procedure. She was also an assessor in the Abgeordnetenahus presidium.

After the 2016 Berlin state election, Seibeld was elected as vice president of the Abgeordnetenhaus. She also joined the Committee for Integration, Labour and Social Affairs. She was re-elected both to the Abgeordnetenhaus and as vice president after the 2021 Berlin state election.

After the re-run 2023 Berlin state election, at which the CDU became the largest party, Seibeld was elected as president of the Abgeordnetenhaus.
