= Berlin House of Representatives =

State legislature in Germany

Coordinates: 52°30′29″N 13°22′55″E

Berlin House of Representatives Abgeordnetenhaus von Berlin
- 20th Abgeordnetenhaus

Type
- Type: Landtag
- Established: 1809

Leadership
- President: Hendrikje Klein, The Left since 29 October 2026
- Vice President: Cornelia Seibeld, CDU since 29 October 2026

Structure
- Seats: 153
- Political groups: Caretaker government (54) CDU (33) SPD (21) Opposition (99) The Left (44) AfD (29) Greens (25) Non-attached (1) The Left (1) (Note: Asya Şenyüz has not yet signed the party’s declaration against antisemitism, which is a condition for admission into the parliamentary group, due to a long-term illness. She will be excluded from the group until then.)

Elections
- Last election: 20 September 2026
- Next election: By 2031

Meeting place
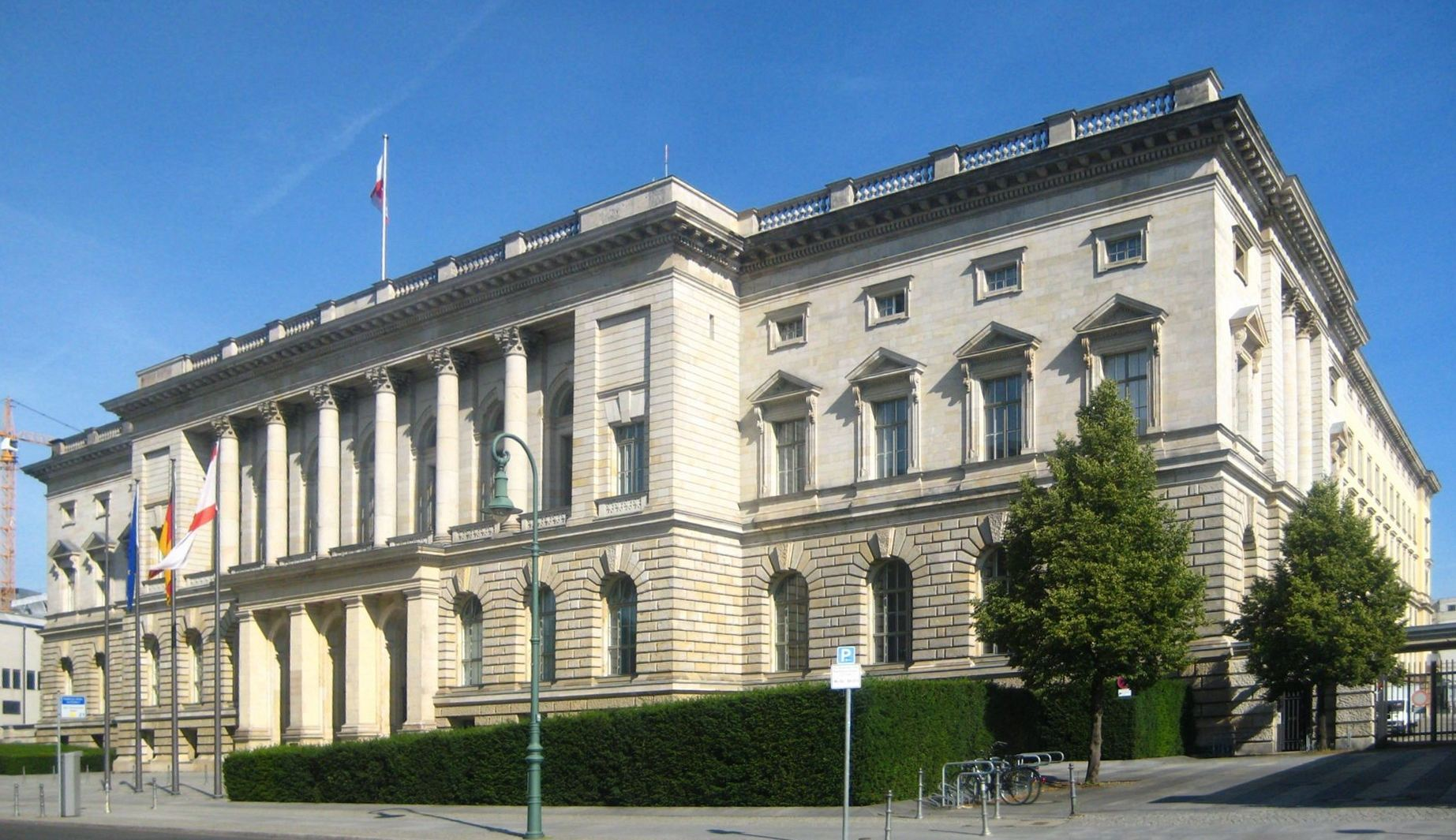
- Preußischer Landtag building

Website
- parlament-berlin.de

The Berlin House of Representatives (German: Abgeordnetenhaus (German: [ˈʔapɡəʔɔʁdnətn̩ˌhaʊs]) is the state parliament (Landtag) of Berlin, Germany according to the city-state's constitution. In 1993, the parliament moved from Rathaus Schöneberg to its present house on Niederkirchnerstraße in Mitte, which from 1899 until 1934 was the seat of the Prussian House of Representatives. The current president of the parliament is Hendrikje Klein (Die Linke).

== History ==
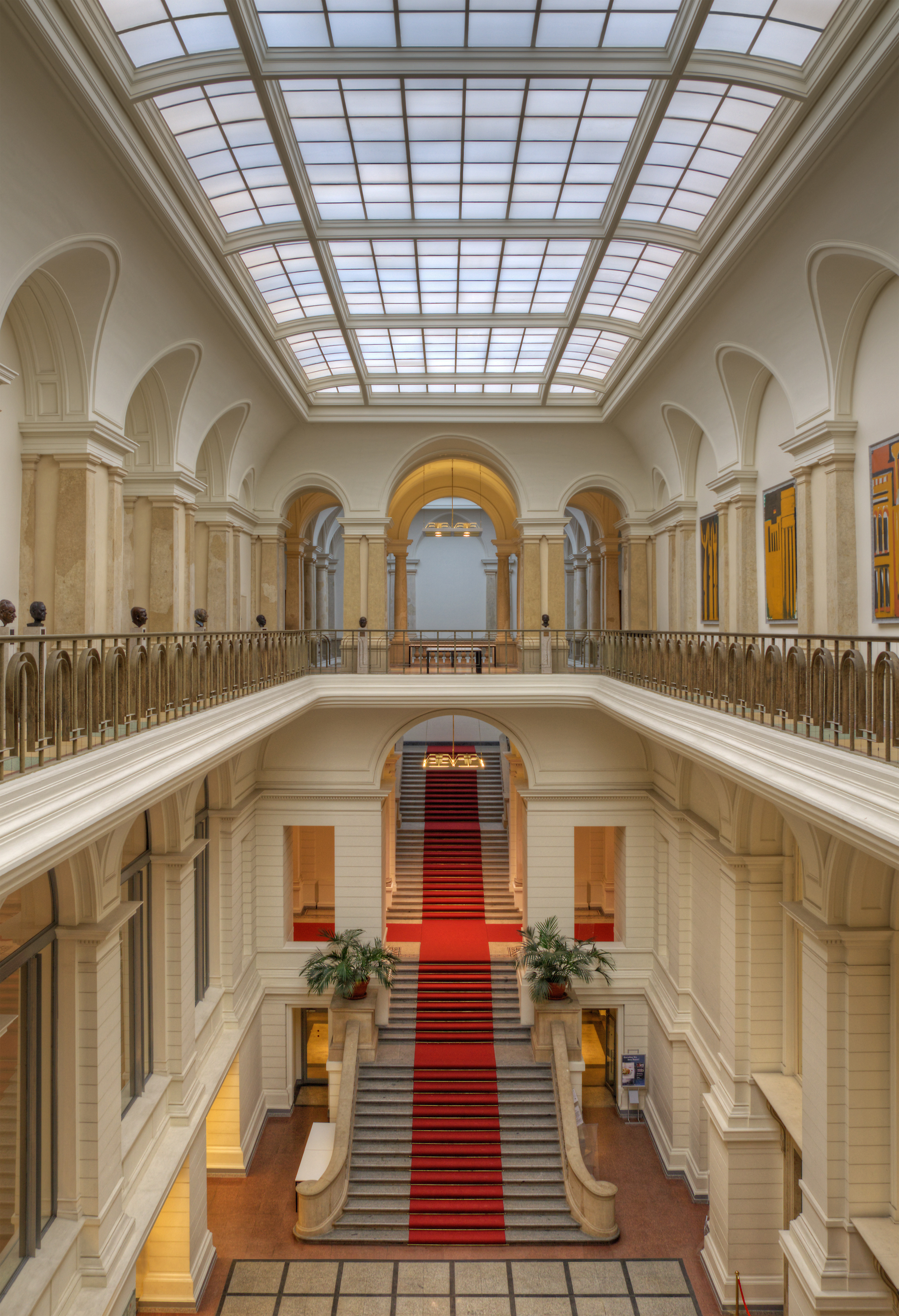
Staircase

The House of Representatives was established by the new constitution of West Berlin in 1951. It replaced the former city legislature called Stadtverordnetenversammlung (city deputies assembly), established by the Prussian Reforms in 1808 and re-established by Allied-initiated state elections of 1946.

Between 1951 and 1990 the House of Representatives was a parliament of restricted autonomy, as all mayors and senators had to be approved by the Allied Kommandatura. (No mayor or senator was ever vetoed after 1951, though before the division of Berlin the Soviet Union vetoed the 1947 election of Ernst Reuter as mayor by the Stadtverordnetenversammlung.) During this time, the House of Representatives had two additional responsibilities: it elected West Berlin's non-voting delegates to the Bundestag on the day of West Germany's federal elections, and since the West German government technically had no power over the city, the House had to ratify all new federal laws before they could take effect.

After reunification, the House of Representatives continued to be the parliament of united Berlin.

== Elections ==
The parliament of Berlin is chosen every five years in a general, free, secret and direct ballot according to the principle of proportional representation. It consists of at least 130 representatives, 78 chosen directly in the electoral districts of the Berlin boroughs, and at least 52 indirectly from state or district lists. If a party wins more constituency seats than its overall share of the vote, the overall size of the House of Representatives increases because of these overhang mandates.

The current distribution of seats as of the 2026 election is:

- The Left: 45 seats
- Christian Democratic Union (CDU): 33 seats
- Alternative for Germany (AfD): 29 seats
- Alliance 90/The Greens: 25 seats
- Social Democratic Party (SPD): 21 seats

== Functions ==
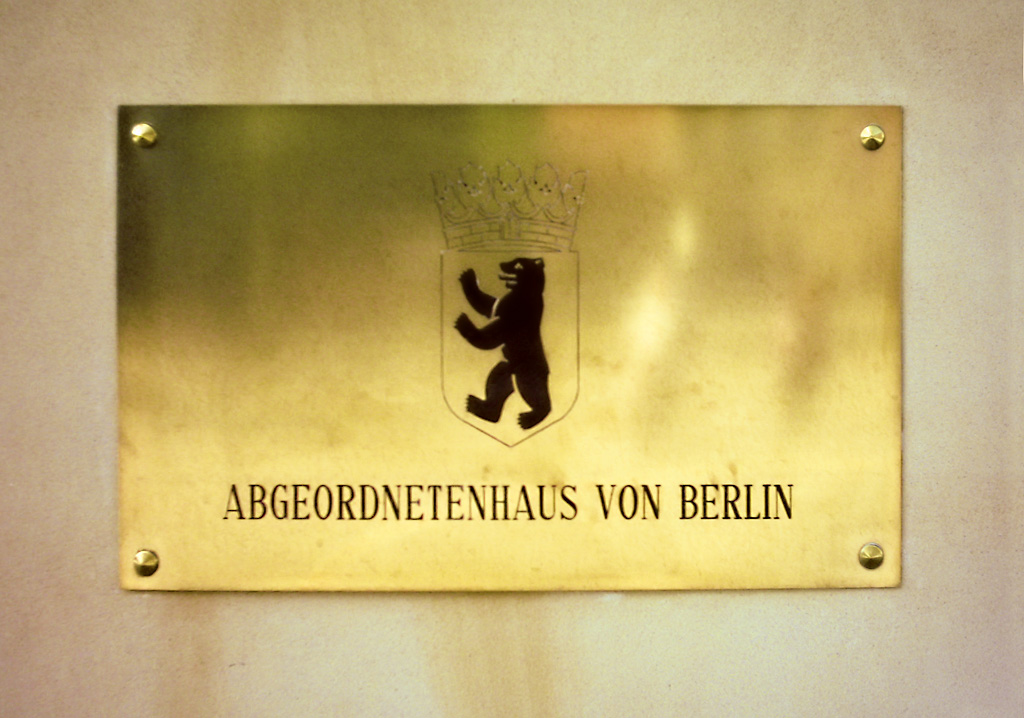
Nameplate

The consideration and passing of legislation is the most important task, including the government budget. In addition, the parliament chooses the Governing Mayor, and checks the city's government, the Senate of Berlin.

Citizens can petition the House of Representatives to debate topics via agenda initiatives.

== Presidents ==
Name	Party	Period
Otto Suhr	SPD	11 January 1951 – 11 January 1955
Willy Brandt	SPD	11 January 1955 – 2 October 1957
Kurt Landsberg	SPD	19 October 1957 – 4 March 1958
Willy Henneberg	SPD	20 March 1958 – 17 September 1961
Otto Friedrich Bach	SPD	29 September 1961 – 6 April 1967
Walter Sickert	SPD	6 April 1967 – 24 April 1975
Peter Lorenz	CDU	24 April 1975 – 10 December 1980
Heinrich Lummer	CDU	10 December 1980 – 11 June 1981
Peter Rebsch	CDU	11 June 1981 – 2 March 1989
Jürgen Wohlrabe	CDU	2 March 1989 – 11 January 1991
Hanna-Renate Laurien	CDU	11 January 1991 – 30 November 1995
Herwig Haase	CDU	30 November 1995 – 18 November 1999
Reinhard Führer	CDU	18 November 1999 – 29 November 2001
Walter Momper	SPD	29 November 2001 – 27 October 2011
Ralf Wieland	SPD	27 October 2011 – 4 November 2021
Dennis Buchner	SPD	4 November 2021 – 16 March 2023
Cornelia Seibeld	CDU	16 March 2023 – present

== See also ==
- Timeline of Berlin
- Category:Members of the Berlin House of Representatives
