= Spandau 2 =

State electoral district of Germany

- Electoral district for the Berlin House of Representatives
- Spandau 2 in 2026
- District: Spandau
- Electorate: 28,442 (2026)

Current electoral district
- Party: AfD
- Member: Andreas Otti

Spandau 2 is an electoral constituency (German: Wahlkreis) represented in the House of Representatives of Berlin. It elects one member via first-past-the-post voting.

== Geography ==
The constituency comprises the areas of Neustadt, Altstadt Spandau, and Klosterfelde, within the borough of Spandau.

There were 28,442 eligible voters in 2026.

== Members ==
Election	Member	Party	%
1999	Werner Krüger	CDU	52.5
2001	Hans-Georg Lorenz	SPD	41.8
2006	Raed Saleh	SPD	39.1
2011	Raed Saleh	SPD	39.9
2016	Raed Saleh	SPD	37.2
2021	Raed Saleh	SPD	32.1
2023	Ersin Nas	CDU	33.2
2026	Andreas Otti	AfD	23.8

== Election results ==
=== 2026 election ===
State election (2026): Spandau 2
Notes:	Blue background denotes the winner of the electorate vote. Pink background denotes a candidate elected from their party list. Yellow background denotes an electorate win by a list member, or other incumbent. A ✓ or ✗ denotes status of any incumbent, win or lose respectively.						
Party	Candidate	Votes	%	±%	Party votes	%	±%
AfD	Andreas Otti	4,212	23.8	▲10.5	4,168	23.3	▲10.5
CDU	✗ Ersin Nas	3,789	21.4	▼11.8	3,457	19.3	▼14.5
SPD	Raed Saleh	3,670	20.7	▼5.3	2,823	15.8	▼7.2
Left	Ender Atakul	3,097	17.5	▲12.4	3,358	18.8	▲13.2
Greens	Maurice Lange	1,351	7.6	▼2.5	1,447	8.1	▼1.7
BSW	Jochen Anders	910	5.1		1,021	5.7	
Tierschutzpartei					593	3.3	▼0.8
FDP					424	2.4	▼1.4
PARTEI	Josch Hinder	395	2.2	▲0.1	186	1.0	▼0.5
Volt	Helmut Scharfenort	281	1.6		242	1.4	▲0.6
PdF					82	0.5	
ÖDP					26	0.1	Steady
du.					19	0.1	Steady
SGP					12	0.1	Steady
DKP					10	0.1	Steady
Informal votes		517			354		
Total valid votes		17,705			17,868		
Turnout		18,222	64.1	▲13.7			
AfD gain from CDU	Majority	423	2.4				

=== 2023 repeat election ===
Changes denoted below for the 2023 election are compared to the 2016 election, as the 2021 election was declared invalid.

State election (2023): Spandau 2
Notes:	Blue background denotes the winner of the electorate vote. Pink background denotes a candidate elected from their party list. Yellow background denotes an electorate win by a list member, or other incumbent. A ✓ or ✗ denotes status of any incumbent, win or lose respectively.						
Party	Candidate	Votes	%	±%	Party votes	%	±%
CDU	Ersin Nas	4,703	33.2	▲11.0	4,795	33.9	▲12.4
SPD	Raed Saleh	3,686	26.0	▼11.2	3,259	23.0	▼7.6
AfD	Tommy Tabor	1,888	13.3	▼4.2	1,818	12.8	▼4.4
Greens	Sebastian Sperlich	1,437	10.1	▲3.6	1,384	9.8	▲1.9
Left	Nadine Krause	724	5.1	▼0.8	787	5.6	▼1.9
Tierschutzpartei	Marina Charlotte Anneliese Gabel	719	5.1		583	4.1	▲1.6
FDP	Dominik Znanewitz	517	3.7	▼1.5	535	3.8	▼1.8
PARTEI	Patrick Ließfeld	298	2.1	Steady	215	1.5	Steady
Volt					100	0.7	
Gray Panthers					94	0.7	▼0.9
The Grays					92	0.7	
Team Todenhöfer					72	0.5	
dieBasis	Javier Peláez Romaguera	112	0.8		57	0.4	
Mieterpartei					51	0.4	
Verjüngungsforschung					44	0.3	▼0.2
FW					43	0.3	
Humanists					28	0.2	
Bildet Berlin!					23	0.2	
ÖDP	Harald Graetschel	39	0.3		22	0.2	
Klimaliste					17	0.1	
du.					13	0.1	
NPD					13	0.1	▼0.7
The Pinks/Alliance 21	Michael Dönicke	36	0.3		10	0.1	
SGP					9	0.1	Steady
BüSo					8	0.1	Steady
DKP					8	0.1	Steady
LKR					4	0.0	▼0.4
Bergpartei, die ÜberPartei					4	0.0	
Informal votes		202			186		
Total valid votes		14,159			14,151		
Turnout		14,372	50.4	▼7.4			
CDU gain from SPD	Majority	1,017	7.2				

=== 2021 election (annulled) ===
The election in 2021 was annulled and rerun in 2023.

State election (2021): Spandau 2
Notes:	Blue background denotes the winner of the electorate vote. Pink background denotes a candidate elected from their party list. Yellow background denotes an electorate win by a list member, or other incumbent. A ✓ or ✗ denotes status of any incumbent, win or lose respectively.						
Party	Candidate	Votes	%	±%	Party votes	%	±%
SPD	✓ Raed Saleh	6,073	32.3	▼5.0	5,198	27.5	▼3.1
CDU	Ersin Nas	3,959	21.1	▼1.2	4,070	21.5	Steady
AfD	Tommy Tabor	2,166	11.5	▼6.0	2,073	11.0	▼6.3
Greens	Sebastian Sperlich	2,116	11.3	▲4.8	2,183	11.6	▲3.7
FDP	Dominik Znanewitz	1,310	7.0	▲1.8	1,309	6.9	▲1.4
Left	Nadine Krause	1,208	6.4	▲0.5	1,268	6.7	▼0.7
Tierschutzpartei	Marina Charlotte Anneliese Gabel	1,049	5.6		728	3.9	▲1.4
PARTEI	Patrick Ließfeld	487	2.6	▲0.5	332	1.8	▲0.2
Team Todenhöfer					302	1.6	
dieBasis	Javier Peláez Romaguera	303	1.6		219	1.2	
The Grays					189	1.0	
APT					161	0.9	
FW					151	0.8	
Gray Panthers					136	0.7	▼0.8
Volt					128	0.7	
Pirates					81	0.4	▼1.2
Mieterpartei					55	0.3	
Verjüngungsforschung					54	0.3	▼0.3
Humanists					42	0.2	
Bildet Berlin!					39	0.2	
The Pinks/Alliance 21	Michael Dönicke	74	0.4		30	0.2	
ÖDP	Harald Graetschel	61	0.3		29	0.2	
NPD					28	0.1	▼0.6
du.					25	0.1	
Klimaliste					14	0.1	
Bergpartei, die ÜberPartei					12	0.1	
LKR					12	0.1	▼0.3
BüSo					8	0.0	Steady
DKP					8	0.0	Steady
SGP					6	0.0	Steady
Informal votes		402			323		
Total valid votes		18,806			18,890		
Turnout		19,265	66.0	▲8.2			
SPD hold	Majority	2,114	11.2				

== See also ==
- Politics of Berlin
- House of Representatives of Berlin
