= Marzahn-Hellersdorf 2 =

State electoral district of Germany

- Electoral district for the Berlin House of Representatives
- Marzahn-Hellersdorf 2 in 2026
- District: Marzahn-Hellersdorf
- Electorate: 33,391 (2026)

Current electoral district
- Party: AfD
- Member: Anneliese Dummer

Marzahn-Hellersdorf 2 is an electoral constituency (German: Wahlkreis) represented in the House of Representatives of Berlin. It elects one member via first-past-the-post voting.

== Geography ==
The constituency comprises the areas of Gewerbegebiet, Marzahner Promenade, and Allee der Kosmonauten. It is entirely within the borough of Marzahn-Hellersdorf.

There were 33,391 eligible voters in 2026.

== Members ==
Election	Member	Party	%
1999	Margrit Barth	PDS	47.7
2001	Margrit Barth	PDS	52.7
2006	Margrit Barth	The Left	40.6
2011	Manuela Schmidt	The Left	34.9
2016	Manuela Schmidt	The Left	31.8
2021	Manuela Schmidt	The Left	24.1
2023	Olga Gauka	CDU	25.5
2026	Anneliese Dummer	AfD	35.7

== Election results ==
=== 2026 election ===
State election (2026): Marzahn-Hellersdorf 2
Notes:	Blue background denotes the winner of the electorate vote. Pink background denotes a candidate elected from their party list. Yellow background denotes an electorate win by a list member, or other incumbent. A ✓ or ✗ denotes status of any incumbent, win or lose respectively.						
Party	Candidate	Votes	%	±%	Party votes	%	±%
AfD	Anneliese Dummer	7,545	35.1	▲14.1	7,727	35.5	▲15.1
Left	Sarah Bigall	5,155	24.0	▲3.7	5,088	23.4	▲5.9
CDU	Bernd Siggelkow	3,829	17.8	▼7.7	2,758	12.7	▼14.2
SPD	Iris Spranger	1,850	8.6	▼10.4	1,811	8.3	▼9.7
BSW	Enrico Wolf	1,603	7.4		1,666	7.7	
Greens	Benjamin Klettbach	734	3.4	▼0.7	856	3.9	▼0.2
Tierschutzpartei					793	3.6	▲0.3
Volt	David Appelfelder	454	2.1		297	1.4	▲1.0
FDP	Konrad Klamann	353	1.6	▼1.1	390	1.8	▼0.7
PARTEI					198	0.9	▼0.2
PdF					94	0.4	
DKP					30	0.1	▼0.2
du.					25	0.1	▼0.1
ÖDP					19	0.1	Steady
SGP					15	0.1	▼0.1
Informal votes		619			375		
Total valid votes		21,523			21,767		
Turnout		22,142	66.3	▲13.9			
AfD gain from CDU	Majority	2,390	11.1				

=== 2023 repeat election ===
Changes denoted below for the 2023 election are compared to the 2016 election, as the 2021 election was declared invalid.

State election (2023): Marzahn-Hellersdorf 2
Notes:	Blue background denotes the winner of the electorate vote. Pink background denotes a candidate elected from their party list. Yellow background denotes an electorate win by a list member, or other incumbent. A ✓ or ✗ denotes status of any incumbent, win or lose respectively.						
Party	Candidate	Votes	%	±%	Party votes	%	±%
CDU	Olga Gauka	4,353	25.5	▲14.6	4,594	26.9	▲15.8
AfD	Anneliese Dummer	3,580	20.9	▼4.4	3,495	20.4	▼4.3
Left	✗ Manuela Schmidt	3,456	20.2	▼11.6	2,993	17.5	▼10.4
SPD	Iris Spranger	3,242	19.0	▼1.8	3,088	18.1	▼0.3
Tierschutzpartei	Harald Gerhard Zentner	753	4.4		572	3.3	▲1.5
Greens	Julia Scharf	696	4.1	▼0.1	707	4.1	▲0.6
FDP	Kevin Weis	473	2.8	▼0.1	432	2.5	Steady
PARTEI	Julia Sophie Gabert	298	1.7		195	1.1	▲0.1
The Grays					146	0.9	
Gray Panthers					127	0.7	▼1.4
Verjüngungsforschung					84	0.5	▼0.4
dieBasis	Frank Mann	172	1.0		81	0.5	
Mieterpartei					67	0.4	
NPD	Lars Niendorf	70	0.4	▼1.3	65	0.4	▼1.3
Pirates					63	0.4	▼0.9
Volt					61	0.4	
DKP					59	0.3	Steady
FW					47	0.3	
Bildet Berlin!					43	0.3	
Team Todenhöfer					41	0.2	
Humanists					31	0.2	
du.					29	0.2	
SGP					21	0.1	Steady
The Pinks/Alliance 21					15	0.1	
ÖDP					9	0.1	
BüSo					8	0.0	▼0.1
LKR					7	0.0	▼0.5
Bergpartei, die ÜberPartei					5	0.0	
Informal votes		222			201		
Total valid votes		17,093			17,104		
Turnout		17,332	52.4	▼6.5			
CDU gain from Left	Majority	773	4.6				

=== 2021 election (annulled) ===
The election in 2021 was annulled and rerun in 2023.

State election (2021): Marzahn-Hellersdorf 2
Notes:	Blue background denotes the winner of the electorate vote. Pink background denotes a candidate elected from their party list. Yellow background denotes an electorate win by a list member, or other incumbent. A ✓ or ✗ denotes status of any incumbent, win or lose respectively.						
Party	Candidate	Votes	%	±%	Party votes	%	±%
Left	✓ Manuela Schmidt	5,156	24.0	▼7.7	4,498	20.9	▼6.9
SPD	Iris Spranger	5,016	23.4	▲2.6	4,956	23.1	▲4.7
AfD	Anneliese Dummer	3,773	17.6	▼7.8	3,685	17.2	▼7.5
CDU	Olga Gauka	3,197	14.9	▲4.1	3,344	15.6	▲4.5
Greens	Julia Scharf	1,206	5.6	▲1.5	1,188	5.5	▲2.0
FDP	Kevin Weis	1,088	5.1	▲2.2	1,000	4.7	▲2.2
Tierschutzpartei	Harald Gerhard Zentner	1,038	4.8		700	3.3	▲1.4
PARTEI	Julia Sophie Gabert	520	2.4		309	1.4	▲0.4
The Grays					268	1.2	
Gray Panthers					207	1.0	▼1.1
dieBasis	Frank Mann	376	1.8		193	0.9	
FW					167	0.8	
APT					157	0.7	
Verjüngungsforschung					121	0.6	▼0.3
Volt					100	0.5	
Pirates					94	0.4	▼0.9
NPD	Lars Niendorf	89	0.4	▼1.3	78	0.4	▼1.3
Mieterpartei					74	0.3	
Humanists					56	0.3	
Team Todenhöfer					55	0.3	
DKP					54	0.3	▼0.1
Bildet Berlin!					47	0.2	
du.					37	0.2	
LKR					22	0.1	▼0.4
Klimaliste					16	0.1	
SGP					15	0.1	▼0.1
Bergpartei, die ÜberPartei					11	0.1	
BüSo					11	0.1	▼0.1
ÖDP					11	0.1	
The Pinks/Alliance 21					11	0.1	
Informal votes		346			272		
Total valid votes		21,449			21,485		
Turnout		21,821	66.1	▲7.2			
Left hold	Majority	140	0.6				

== See also ==
- Politics of Berlin
- House of Representatives of Berlin
