= Marzahn-Hellersdorf 1 =

State electoral district of Germany

- Electoral district for the Berlin House of Representatives
- Marzahn-Hellersdorf 1 in 2026
- District: Marzahn-Hellersdorf
- Electorate: 31,803 (2026)

Current electoral district
- Party: AfD
- Member: Gunnar Lindermann

Marzahn-Hellersdorf 1 is an electoral constituency (German: Wahlkreis) represented in the House of Representatives of Berlin. It elects one member via first-past-the-post voting.

== Geography ==
The constituency comprises the areas of Marzahn-North, Marzahn-West, and Marzahn-East. It is entirely within the borough of Marzahn-Hellersdorf.

There were 31,803 eligible voters in 2026.

== Members ==
Election	Member	Party	%
1999	Wolfgang Brauer	PDS	50.1
2001	Wolfgang Brauer	PDS	56.1
2006	Wolfgang Brauer	The Left	41.1
2011	Wolfgang Brauer	The Left	36.4
2016	Gunnar Lindemann	AfD	30.6
2021	Gunnar Lindemann	AfD	22.6
2023	Gunnar Lindemann	AfD	28.8
2026	Gunnar Lindemann	AfD	45.1

== Election results ==
=== 2026 election ===
State election (2026): Marzahn-Hellersdorf 1
Notes:	Blue background denotes the winner of the electorate vote. Pink background denotes a candidate elected from their party list. Yellow background denotes an electorate win by a list member, or other incumbent. A ✓ or ✗ denotes status of any incumbent, win or lose respectively.						
Party	Candidate	Votes	%	±%	Party votes	%	±%
AfD	✓ Gunnar Lindemann	8,585	45.1	▲16.3	8,535	44.2	▲16.2
Left	Björn Tielebein	4,370	23.0	▲4.7	4,105	21.3	▲5.3
CDU	Susanne Gontard	1,720	9.0	▼13.0	1,657	8.6	▼14.4
SPD	Gordon Lemm	1,669	8.8	▼8.5	1,272	6.6	▼8.4
BSW	Rosemarie Voß	1,361	7.2		1,369	7.1	
Tierschutzpartei					891	4.6	▲0.6
Greens	Niclas Rother	613	3.2	▲0.2	599	3.1	▼0.4
Volt	Lars Gaudian	400	2.1		236	1.2	▲0.8
FDP	Ingo Gering	311	1.6	▼0.3	293	1.5	▼0.7
PARTEI					168	0.9	▼0.5
PdF					101	0.5	
du.					25	0.1	Steady
ÖDP					24	0.1	▲0.1
DKP					22	0.1	▼0.2
SGP					15	0.1	Steady
Informal votes		631			348		
Total valid votes		19,029			19,312		
Turnout		19,660	61.8	▲17.4			
AfD hold	Majority	4,215	22.1	▲15.3			

=== 2023 repeat election ===
Changes denoted below for the 2023 election are compared to the 2016 election, as the 2021 election was declared invalid.

State election (2023): Marzahn-Hellersdorf 1
Notes:	Blue background denotes the winner of the electorate vote. Pink background denotes a candidate elected from their party list. Yellow background denotes an electorate win by a list member, or other incumbent. A ✓ or ✗ denotes status of any incumbent, win or lose respectively.						
Party	Candidate	Votes	%	±%	Party votes	%	±%
AfD	✓ Gunnar Lindemann	3,945	28.8	▼1.7	3,835	28.0	▼1.0
CDU	Medina Schaubert	3,013	22.0	▲12.9	3,143	22.9	▲13.7
Left	Björn Tielebein	2,499	18.3	▼10.4	2,185	16.0	▼9.6
SPD	Gordon Lemm	2,366	17.3	▼1.2	2,059	15.0	▼0.6
Tierschutzpartei	Ina Seidel-Grothe	709	5.2		547	4.0	▲1.2
Greens	June Tomiak	419	3.1	▼1.1	482	3.5	▲0.1
FDP	Batuhan Temiz	271	2.0	▼0.4	304	2.2	▲0.1
PARTEI	Daniel Pranner	262	1.9		194	1.4	▲0.2
The Grays					129	0.9	
Gray Panthers					128	0.9	▼1.3
Verjüngungsforschung					90	0.7	▼0.5
dieBasis	Cornelia Klier	118	0.9		75	0.5	
NPD	Nadine Leonhardt	89	0.7	▼1.9	80	0.6	▼2.1
Mieterpartei					70	0.5	
Pirates					63	0.5	▼1.1
Volt					57	0.4	
FW					48	0.4	
DKP					45	0.3	Steady
Humanists					32	0.2	
Bildet Berlin!					31	0.2	
Team Todenhöfer					27	0.2	
du.					17	0.1	
The Pinks/Alliance 21					14	0.1	
Klimaliste					11	0.1	
BüSo					9	0.1	Steady
LKR					8	0.1	▼0.6
ÖDP					6	0.0	
SGP					6	0.0	▼0.1
Bergpartei, die ÜberPartei					1	0.0	
Informal votes		180			152		
Total valid votes		13,691			13,696		
Turnout		13,878	44.4	▼6.2			
AfD hold	Majority	932	6.8				

=== 2021 election (annulled) ===
The election in 2021 was annulled and rerun in 2023.

State election (2021): Marzahn-Hellersdorf 1
Notes:	Blue background denotes the winner of the electorate vote. Pink background denotes a candidate elected from their party list. Yellow background denotes an electorate win by a list member, or other incumbent. A ✓ or ✗ denotes status of any incumbent, win or lose respectively.						
Party	Candidate	Votes	%	±%	Party votes	%	±%
AfD	✓ Gunnar Lindemann	4,049	22.7	▼7.9	4,008	21.7	▼7.3
SPD	Gordon Lemm	3,979	22.3	▲3.8	3,720	20.1	▲4.5
Left	Björn Tielebein	3,756	21.0	▼7.6	3,441	18.6	▼6.9
CDU	Medina Schaubert	2,170	12.1	▲3.0	2,339	12.7	▲3.4
Tierschutzpartei	Ina Seidel-Grothe	1,156	6.5		704	3.8	▲1.0
FDP	Batuhan Temiz	912	5.1	▲2.7	959	5.2	▲3.1
Greens	June Tomiak	900	5.0	▲0.9	987	5.3	▲1.9
PARTEI	Daniel Pranner	476	2.7		359	1.9	▲0.7
The Grays					288	1.6	
dieBasis	Cornelia Klier	361	2.0		210	1.1	
Gray Panthers					205	1.1	▼1.2
APT					203	1.1	
FW					196	1.1	
Pirates					115	0.6	▼0.9
Verjüngungsforschung					113	0.6	▼0.5
Mieterpartei					103	0.6	
Volt					97	0.5	
NPD	Nadine Leonhardt	116	0.6	▼1.9	91	0.5	▼2.2
Team Todenhöfer					57	0.3	
du.					45	0.2	
Bildet Berlin!					44	0.2	
DKP					44	0.2	▼0.1
Humanists					32	0.2	
LKR					24	0.1	▼0.5
BüSo					22	0.1	Steady
ÖDP					17	0.1	
Klimaliste					16	0.1	
The Pinks/Alliance 21					13	0.1	
Bergpartei, die ÜberPartei					10	0.1	
SGP					5	0.0	▼0.1
Informal votes		356			260		
Total valid votes		17,875			18,467		
Turnout		18,762	59.7	▲9.0			
AfD hold	Majority	70	0.4				

== See also ==
- Politics of Berlin
- House of Representatives of Berlin
