= Pankow 9 =

State electoral district of Germany

- Electoral district for the Berlin House of Representatives
- Pankow 9 in 2026
- District: Pankow
- Electorate: 34,144 (2026)

Current electoral district
- Party: The Left
- Member: Maximilian Schirmer

Pankow 9 is an electoral constituency (German: Wahlkreis) represented in the House of Representatives of Berlin. It elects one member via first-past-the-post voting.

== Geography ==
The constituency comprises the areas of Greifswalder Straße, Berliner Allee, Indira-Gandhi-Straße up to the Lichtenberg district border, and Greifswalder Straße up to the Friedrichshain-Kreuzberg district border, within the borough of Pankow.

There were 34,144 eligible voters in 2026.

== Members ==
Election	Member	Party	%
2006	Susann Engert	SPD	33.7
2011	Nikolaus Karsten	SPD	33.2
2016	Tino Schopf	SPD	24.6
2021	Tino Schopf	SPD	27.4
2023	Tino Schopf	SPD	25.6
2026	Maximilian Schirmer	Left	28.1

== Election results ==
=== 2026 election ===
State election (2026): Pankow 9
Notes:	Blue background denotes the winner of the electorate vote. Pink background denotes a candidate elected from their party list. Yellow background denotes an electorate win by a list member, or other incumbent. A ✓ or ✗ denotes status of any incumbent, win or lose respectively.						
Party	Candidate	Votes	%	±%	Party votes	%	±%
Left	Maximilian Schirmer	7,423	28.1	▲12.8	8,305	31.4	▲13.4
SPD	✗ Tino Schopf	6,668	25.3	▼0.3	3,305	12.5	▼5.1
Greens	Oliver Jütting	4,373	16.6	▼7.7	4,847	18.3	▼6.3
AfD	Frank Behnke	3,253	12.3	▲4.5	3,360	12.7	▲4.8
CDU	David Paul	2,431	9.2	▼7.7	3,134	11.8	▼5.9
BSW	Jobst Bürkle	1,065	4.0		1,237	4.7	
Volt	Paul-Johann von Loeper	767	2.9		807	3.1	▲1.8
Tierschutzpartei					512	1.9	▼0.4
FDP	Julius Grottke	427	1.6	▼1.5	489	1.8	▼2.1
PARTEI					246	0.9	▼1.0
PdF					83	0.3	
DKP					50	0.2	▼0.1
ÖDP					47	0.2	▲0.1
du.					24	0.1	▼0.1
SGP					12	0.0	Steady
Informal votes		337			286		
Total valid votes		26,407			26,458		
Turnout		26,744	78.3	▲11.8			
Left gain from SPD	Majority	755	2.8				

=== 2023 repeat election ===
Changes denoted below for the 2023 election are compared to the 2016 election, as the 2021 election was declared invalid.

State election (2023): Pankow 9
Notes:	Blue background denotes the winner of the electorate vote. Pink background denotes a candidate elected from their party list. Yellow background denotes an electorate win by a list member, or other incumbent. A ✓ or ✗ denotes status of any incumbent, win or lose respectively.						
Party	Candidate	Votes	%	±%	Party votes	%	±%
SPD	✓ Tino Schopf	5,551	25.6	▲1.0	3,811	17.5	▼2.8
Greens	Stefanie Remlinger	5,267	24.3	▲5.5	5,341	24.6	▲5.2
CDU	David Paul	3,663	16.9	▲5.4	3,848	17.7	▲7.1
Left	Michaeil Nelken	3,324	15.3	▼8.2	3,905	18.0	▼5.6
AfD	Frank Behnke	1,697	7.8	▼4.4	1,721	7.9	▼4.1
FDP	Artur Gärtner	675	3.1	▼0.6	864	4.0	▼0.5
Tierschutzpartei	Matthias Clemens Schröder	626	2.9		505	2.3	▲0.5
PARTEI	Kerstin Kruschwitz	550	2.5	▼0.7	410	1.9	▼0.8
Volt					282	1.3	
dieBasis	Nikolai Zinke	216	1.0		174	0.8	
The Grays					108	0.5	
Mieterpartei					103	0.5	
Klimaliste					79	0.4	
Pirates					78	0.4	▼1.7
Gray Panthers					67	0.3	▼0.6
Verjüngungsforschung					63	0.3	▼0.2
DKP					53	0.2	▼0.1
FW	Rüdiger Voigt	101	0.5		52	0.2	
Team Todenhöfer					49	0.2	
du.					45	0.2	
Humanists					36	0.2	
ÖDP					27	0.1	
Bildet Berlin!					23	0.1	
DL	Eckehart Ehrenberg	22	0.1				
NPD					19	0.1	▼0.4
Bergpartei, die ÜberPartei					18	0.1	
SGP					17	0.1	▼0.1
The Pinks/Alliance 21					11	0.1	
LKR					7	0.0	▼0.3
BüSo					5	0.0	▼0.1
Informal votes		148			126		
Total valid votes		21,692			21,721		
Turnout		21,864	66.6	▼3.0			
SPD hold	Majority	294	1.3				

=== 2021 election (annulled) ===
The election in 2021 was annulled and rerun in 2023.

State election (2021): Pankow 9
Notes:	Blue background denotes the winner of the electorate vote. Pink background denotes a candidate elected from their party list. Yellow background denotes an electorate win by a list member, or other incumbent. A ✓ or ✗ denotes status of any incumbent, win or lose respectively.						
Party	Candidate	Votes	%	±%	Party votes	%	±%
SPD	✓ Tino Schopf	6,878	27.4	▲2.9	4,739	18.9	▼1.4
Greens	Stefanie Remlinger	6,138	24.5	▲5.7	6,303	25.1	▲5.8
Left	Michaeil Nelken	4,518	18.0	▼5.5	5,170	20.6	▼3.0
CDU	David Paul	2,603	10.4	▼1.1	2,663	10.6	Steady
AfD	Frank Behnke	1,597	6.4	▼5.8	1,626	6.5	▼5.5
FDP	Artur Gärtner	1,163	4.6	▲1.0	1,402	5.6	▲1.1
Tierschutzpartei	Matthias Clemens Schröder	741	3.0		514	2.0	▲0.2
PARTEI	Kerstin Kruschwitz	726	2.9	▼0.4	580	2.3	▼0.4
dieBasis	Nikolai Zinke	449	1.8		383	1.5	
Volt					370	1.5	
Klimaliste					178	0.7	
FW	Rüdiger Voigt	238	0.9		166	0.7	
The Grays					159	0.6	
Gray Panthers					118	0.5	▼0.4
APT					97	0.4	
Pirates					96	0.4	▼1.7
Mieterpartei					94	0.4	
Verjüngungsforschung					72	0.3	▼0.3
Team Todenhöfer					64	0.3	
Humanists					57	0.2	
du.					52	0.2	
DKP					50	0.2	▼0.1
ÖDP					34	0.1	
Bergpartei, die ÜberPartei					30	0.1	
NPD					30	0.1	▼0.3
Bildet Berlin!					23	0.1	
DL	Eckehart Ehrenberg	21	0.1				
The Pinks/Alliance 21					12	0.0	
SGP					10	0.2	▼0.1
LKR					8	0.0	▼0.3
BüSo					4	0.0	▼0.1
Informal votes		239			205		
Total valid votes		25,072			25,104		
Turnout		25,349	76.8	▲7.2			
SPD hold	Majority	740	2.9				

== See also ==
- Politics of Berlin
- House of Representatives of Berlin
