= Tempelhof-Schöneberg 6 =

State electoral district of Germany

- Electoral district for the Berlin House of Representatives
- Tempelhof-Schöneberg 6 in 2026
- District: Tempelhof-Schöneberg
- Electorate: 31,256 (2026)

Current electoral district
- Party: CDU
- Member: Scott Körber

Tempelhof-Schöneberg 6 is an electoral constituency (German: Wahlkreis) represented in the House of Representatives of Berlin. It elects one member via first-past-the-post voting.

== Geography ==
The constituency comprises the southern part of the Mariendorf district, and the northern part of the Marienfelde district, and is entirely within the borough of Tempelhof-Schöneberg.

There were 31,256 eligible voters in 2026.

== Members ==
Election	Member	Party	%
2006	Rainer Ueckert	CDU	39.9
2011	Florian Graf	CDU	43.7
2016	Florian Graf	CDU	32.1
2021	Scott Körber	CDU	33.1
2023	Scott Körber	CDU	47.5
2026	Scott Körber	CDU	31.8

== Election results ==
=== 2026 election ===
State election (2026): Tempelhof-Schöneberg 6
Notes:	Blue background denotes the winner of the electorate vote. Pink background denotes a candidate elected from their party list. Yellow background denotes an electorate win by a list member, or other incumbent. A ✓ or ✗ denotes status of any incumbent, win or lose respectively.						
Party	Candidate	Votes	%	±%	Party votes	%	±%
CDU	✓ Scott Körber	7,061	31.8	▼15.6	6,833	30.6	▼15.1
AfD	Karsten Franck	4,349	19.6	▲10.0	4,463	20.0	▲10.4
SPD	Oliver Schworck	3,529	15.9	▼4.8	3,199	14.3	▼5.7
Left	Max Zahoransky von Worlik	2,584	11.6	▲8.0	2,995	13.4	▲9.6
Greens	Charlotte Kreft	2,146	9.7	▲0.1	1,965	8.8	▼0.3
BSW	Alexander King	952	4.3		1,025	4.6	
FDP	Sergej Deines	657	3.0	▼1.1	757	3.4	▼1.4
Tierschutzpartei	Sara Monka	603	2.7	▼0.3	577	2.6	▲0.2
Volt	Jan Ehlting	307	1.4		273	1.2	▲0.7
PARTEI					111	0.5	▼0.3
PdF					59	0.3	
ÖDP					40	0.2	▲0.1
du.					25	0.1	Steady
DKP					16	0.1	Steady
SGP					4	0.0	Steady
Informal votes		475			321		
Total valid votes		22,188			22,342		
Turnout		22,663	72.5	▲9.3			
CDU hold	Majority	2,712	12.2	▼14.5			

=== 2023 repeat election ===
Changes denoted below for the 2023 election are compared to the 2016 election, as the 2021 election was declared invalid.

State election (2023): Tempelhof-Schöneberg 6
Notes:	Blue background denotes the winner of the electorate vote. Pink background denotes a candidate elected from their party list. Yellow background denotes an electorate win by a list member, or other incumbent. A ✓ or ✗ denotes status of any incumbent, win or lose respectively.						
Party	Candidate	Votes	%	±%	Party votes	%	±%
CDU	Scott Körber	9,345	47.4	▲15.3	8,987	45.6	▲16.2
SPD	Sinem Taşan-Funke	4,081	20.7	▼4.5	3,935	20.0	▼4.3
Greens	Friedemann Dau	1,891	9.6	▼0.8	1,787	9.1	▼0.1
AfD	Martin Reimann	1,882	9.6	▼6.8	1,887	9.6	▼6.2
FDP	Axel Bering	808	4.1	▼4.5	944	4.8	▼4.5
Left	Harald Gindra	720	3.7	▼1.9	746	3.8	▼1.6
Tierschutzpartei	Gabriella Maria Perotto	596	3.0		471	2.4	▲0.6
PARTEI	Johannes Linke	245	1.2		158	0.8	Steady
Gray Panthers					101	0.5	▼0.5
Team Todenhöfer					94	0.5	
Volt					93	0.5	
dieBasis	Jonas Attner	128	0.6		75	0.4	
The Grays					62	0.3	
Pirates					59	0.3	▼0.8
FW					53	0.3	
Verjüngungsforschung					45	0.2	▼0.1
Bildet Berlin!					30	0.2	
Mieterpartei					28	0.1	
du.					18	0.1	
MW					18	0.1	▼0.2
ÖDP					17	0.1	
Klimaliste					15	0.1	
NPD					15	0.1	▼0.4
Humanists					15	0.1	
DKP					10	0.1	
The Pinks/Alliance 21					8	0.0	
BüSo					6	0.0	Steady
Bergpartei, die ÜberPartei					5	0.0	
SGP					4	0.0	Steady
LKR					3	0.0	▼0.4
Informal votes		19,696			19,689		
Total valid votes		214			195		
Turnout		19,929	63.2	▼3.7			
CDU hold	Majority	5,264	26.7				

=== 2021 election (annulled) ===
The election in 2021 was annulled and rerun in 2023.

State election (2021): Tempelhof-Schöneberg 6
Notes:	Blue background denotes the winner of the electorate vote. Pink background denotes a candidate elected from their party list. Yellow background denotes an electorate win by a list member, or other incumbent. A ✓ or ✗ denotes status of any incumbent, win or lose respectively.						
Party	Candidate	Votes	%	±%	Party votes	%	±%
CDU	Scott Körber	7,658	33.1	▲0.9	7,234	30.9	▲1.4
SPD	Sinem Taşan-Funke	6,140	26.5	▲1.3	5,984	25.2	▲0.9
Greens	Friedemann Dau	2,545	11.0	▲0.6	2,478	10.6	▲1.4
AfD	Martin Reimann	2,140	9.2	▼7.2	2,123	9.1	▼6.7
FDP	Axel Bering	2,060	8.9	▲0.3	2,106	9.0	▼0.3
Left	Harald Gindra	985	4.3	▼1.3	1,055	4.5	▼0.9
Tierschutzpartei	Gabriella Maria Perotto	908	3.9		523	2.2	▲0.4
Team Todenhöfer					298	1.3	
PARTEI	Johannes Linke	367	1.6		234	1.0	▲0.2
dieBasis	Jonas Attner	365	1.6		243	1.0	
FW					209	0.9	
The Grays					174	0.7	
APT					149	0.6	
Gray Panthers					130	0.6	▼0.5
Pirates					102	0.4	▼0.7
Volt					102	0.4	
Verjüngungsforschung					63	0.3	Steady
Mieterpartei					38	0.2	
Bildet Berlin!					34	0.1	
ÖDP					33	0.1	
Klimaliste					32	0.1	
Humanists					29	0.1	
NPD					24	0.1	▼0.4
du.					21	0.1	
MW					19	0.1	▼0.2
LKR					18	0.1	▼0.3
BüSo					10	0.0	Steady
DKP					9	0.0	Steady
The Pinks/Alliance 21					8	0.0	
Bergpartei, die ÜberPartei					5	0.0	
SGP					2	0.0	▼0.1
Informal votes		382			293		
Total valid votes		23,168			23,399		
Turnout		23,740	74.1	▲7.1			
CDU hold	Majority	1,518	6.6				

== See also ==
- Politics of Berlin
- House of Representatives of Berlin
