= Reinickendorf 5 =

State electoral district of Germany

- Electoral district for the Berlin House of Representatives
- Reinickendorf 5 in 2026
- District: Reinickendorf
- Electorate: 27,604 (2026)

Current electoral district
- Party: AfD
- Member: Carsten Ubbelohde

Reinickendorf 5 is an electoral constituency (German: Wahlkreis) represented in the House of Representatives of Berlin. It elects one member via first-past-the-post voting.

== Geography ==
The constituency comprises the districts of Lübars and Märkisches Viertel. It is entirely within the borough of Reinickendorf.

There were 27,604 eligible voters in 2026.

== Members ==
Election	Member	Party	%
1999	CDU	Michael Dietmann	58.4
2001	CDU	Michael Dietmann	44.1
2006	CDU	Michael Dietmann	37.3
2011	CDU	Michael Dietmann	40.7
2016	CDU	Michael Dietmann	30.5
2021	CDU	Michael Dietmann	30.7
2023	CDU	Michael Dietmann	43.8
2026	AfD	Carsten Ubbelohde	26.8

== Election results ==
=== 2026 election ===
State election (2026): Reinickendorf 5
Notes:	Blue background denotes the winner of the electorate vote. Pink background denotes a candidate elected from their party list. Yellow background denotes an electorate win by a list member, or other incumbent. A ✓ or ✗ denotes status of any incumbent, win or lose respectively.						
Party	Candidate	Votes	%	±%	Party votes	%	±%
AfD	Carsten Ubbelohde	4,386	26.8	▲12.7	4,373	26.5	▲12.1
CDU	Matea Krolo	3,914	23.9	▼19.9	3,627	21.9	▼19.0
Left	Gülistan Erdil	3,101	18.9	▲15.1	3,116	18.9	▲15.0
SPD	Sevda Boyraci	2,284	14.0	▼8.6	2,162	13.1	▼8.7
Greens	Nico Wanke	1,063	6.5	▲0.1	1,013	6.1	▼0.5
BSW	Christiane Wiemann	926	5.7		970	5.9	
APT					491	3.0	▲0.3
FDP	Andreas Otto	399	2.4	▼0.7	393	2.4	▼1.4
Volt	Nina Müller	292	1.8		189	1.1	▲0.8
PARTEI					100	0.6	▼0.3
PdF					48	0.3	
ÖDP					15	0.1	
du.					12	0.1	Steady
SGP					9	0.1	
DKP					7	0.0	
Informal votes		489			329		
Total valid votes		16,365			16,525		
Turnout		16,854	61.1	▲11.3			
AfD gain from CDU	Majority	472	2.9				

=== 2023 repeat election ===
Changes denoted below for the 2023 election are compared to the 2016 election, as the 2021 election was declared invalid.

State election (2023): Reinickendorf 5
Notes:	Blue background denotes the winner of the electorate vote. Pink background denotes a candidate elected from their party list. Yellow background denotes an electorate win by a list member, or other incumbent. A ✓ or ✗ denotes status of any incumbent, win or lose respectively.						
Party	Candidate	Votes	%	±%	Party votes	%	±%
CDU	✓ Michael Dietmann	5,702	43.8	▲13.3	5,356	41.0	▲13.7
SPD	Sevda Boyraci	2,934	22.5	▼5.6	2,846	21.8	▼2.6
AfD	Carsten Ubbelohde	1,838	14.1	▼6.0	1,876	14.4	▼5.1
Greens	Cherim Adelhoefer	835	6.4	Steady	867	6.6	▼0.3
Left	Katina Schubert	506	3.9	▼1.7	504	3.9	▼1.8
APT	Sarah-Ursula Oelsmann	428	3.3		350	2.7	▲0.7
FDP	Andreas Vetter	407	3.1	▼3.0	497	3.8	▼2.8
The Grays					117	0.9	
PARTEI	Patrick Alms	144	1.1		116	0.9	▲0.1
Team Todenhöfer					94	0.7	
Gray Panthers					77	0.6	▼2.9
FW	Nora Ferge	90	0.7		30	0.2	
dieBasis	Sören Jagla	79	0.6		54	0.4	
Volt					50	0.4	
Verjüngungsforschung					46	0.4	▼0.1
Pirates	Kenny Kick	64	0.5	▼1.2	46	0.4	▼0.6
Mieterpartei					35	0.3	
NPD					21	0.2	▼0.6
Humanists					20	0.2	
Klimaliste					12	0.1	
du.					11	0.1	
ÖDP					10	0.1	
Bildet Berlin!					9	0.1	
The Pinks/Alliance 21					5	0.0	
SGP					5	0.0	Steady
DKP					4	0.0	Steady
REP					4	0.0	
BüSo					2	0.0	▼0.1
LKR					2	0.0	▼0.3
Bergpartei, die ÜberPartei					0	0.0	
Informal votes		155			150		
Total valid votes		13,027			13,066		
Turnout		13,225	49.8	▼7.5			
CDU hold	Majority	2,768	21.3				

== See also ==
- Politics of Berlin
- House of Representatives of Berlin
