= Spandau 1 =

State electoral district of Germany

- Electoral district for the Berlin House of Representatives
- Spandau 1 in 2026
- District: Spandau
- Electorate: 34,898 (2026)

Current electoral district
- Party: CDU
- Member: Bettna Meißner

Spandau 1 is an electoral constituency (German: Wahlkreis) represented in the House of Representatives of Berlin. It elects one member via first-past-the-post voting.

== Geography ==
The constituency comprises the areas of Hakenfelde and Falkenhagener Feld/North, within the borough of Spandau.

There were 34,898 eligible voters in 2026.

== Members ==
Election	Member	Party	%
1999	Kai Wegner	CDU	52.9
2001	Thomas Kleineidam	SPD	42.0
2006	Thomas Kleineidam	SPD	40.1
2011	Thomas Kleineidam	SPD	39.7
2016	Bettina Domer	SPD	31.0
2021	Sebahat Atli	SPD	28.7
2023	Bettina Meißner	CDU	37.3
2026	Bettina Meißner	CDU	23.2

== Election results ==
=== 2026 election ===
State election (2026): Spandau 1
Notes:	Blue background denotes the winner of the electorate vote. Pink background denotes a candidate elected from their party list. Yellow background denotes an electorate win by a list member, or other incumbent. A ✓ or ✗ denotes status of any incumbent, win or lose respectively.						
Party	Candidate	Votes	%	±%	Party votes	%	±%
CDU	✓ Bettina Meißner	5,188	23.2	▼14.2	4,910	21.7	▼15.5
AfD	Tommy Tabor	5,108	22.8	▲10.2	5,078	22.5	▲10.2
SPD	Sebahat Atli	4,226	18.9	▼5.6	3,547	15.7	▼6.5
Left	Isabella-Marie Sander	3,813	17.0	▲12.3	3,953	17.5	▲12.7
Greens	Doreen Frowitter	1,685	7.5	▼1.6	1,877	8.3	▼1.3
BSW	Viola Radke	972	4.3		1,055	4.7	
Tierschutzpartei					819	3.6	▼0.1
FDP	Daniel Maurer	693	3.1	▼1.0	684	3.0	▼1.1
PARTEI	Jakob Winzen	408	1.8	▲0.2	222	1.0	▼0.2
Volt	Friedrich Markgraf	307	1.4		286	1.3	▲0.8
PdF					87	0.4	
ÖDP					45	0.2	Steady
du.					26	0.1	Steady
DKP					5	0.0	Steady
SGP					4	0.0	▼0.1
Informal votes		578			380		
Total valid votes		22,400			22,598		
Turnout		22,978	65.8	▲12.7			
CDU hold	Majority	80	0.4	▼12.4			

=== 2023 repeat election ===
Changes denoted below for the 2023 election are compared to the 2016 election, as the 2021 election was declared invalid.

State election (2023): Spandau 1
Notes:	Blue background denotes the winner of the electorate vote. Pink background denotes a candidate elected from their party list. Yellow background denotes an electorate win by a list member, or other incumbent. A ✓ or ✗ denotes status of any incumbent, win or lose respectively.						
Party	Candidate	Votes	%	±%	Party votes	%	±%
CDU	Bettina Meißner	6,588	37.3	▲11.1	6,567	37.2	13.5
SPD	Sebahat Atli	4,325	24.5	▼6.5	3,916	22.2	▼6.0
AfD	Wolfgang Werner	2,227	12.6	▼5.4	2,158	12.2	▼5.4
Greens	Philipp Freisleben	1,615	9.1	▲1.7	1,690	9.6	▲1.3
Tierschutzpartei	Aida Paola Spiegeler Castañeda	854	4.8		664	3.8	▲1.1
Left	Franziska Leschewitz	827	4.7	▼1.7	855	4.8	▼1.9
FDP	Matthias Unger	725	4.1	▼2.2	725	4.1	▼2.3
PARTEI	Carsten Rengert	295	1.7	Steady	207	1.2	Steady
Gray Panthers					121	0.7	▼0.8
Team Todenhöfer					104	0.6	
The Grays					100	0.6	
Volt					75	0.4	
dieBasis	Peter Schröter	140	0.8		72	0.4	
Pirates					68	0.4	▼1.0
Mieterpartei					51	0.3	
Verjüngungsforschung					47	0.3	▼0.3
FW					44	0.2	
ÖDP	Andreas Schaefer	43	0.2		30	0.2	
Humanists					25	0.1	
du.					23	0.1	
Klimaliste					23	0.1	
Bildet Berlin!					20	0.1	
NPD					13	0.1	▼0.6
LKR	Nicola Jädicke	18	0.1		12	0.1	▼0.4
SGP					12	0.1	Steady
The Pinks/Alliance 21					10	0.1	
Bergpartei, die ÜberPartei					8	0.0	
BüSo					8	0.0	Steady
DKP					8	0.0	▼0.1
Informal votes		200			187		
Total valid votes		17,657			17,656		
Turnout		17,872	53.1	▼7.3			
CDU gain from SPD	Majority	2,263	12.8				

=== 2021 election (annulled) ===
The election in 2021 was annulled and rerun in 2023.

State election (2021): Spandau 1
Notes:	Blue background denotes the winner of the electorate vote. Pink background denotes a candidate elected from their party list. Yellow background denotes an electorate win by a list member, or other incumbent. A ✓ or ✗ denotes status of any incumbent, win or lose respectively.						
Party	Candidate	Votes	%	±%	Party votes	%	±%
SPD	Sebahat Atli	6,346	28.7	▼2.3	6,003	26.4	▼1.8
CDU	Bettina Meißner	5,594	25.3	▼0.9	5,546	24.4	▲0.7
AfD	Wolfgang Werner	2,469	11.2	▼6.8	2,508	11.0	▼6.5
Greens	Philipp Freisleben	2,356	10.7	▲3.3	2,450	10.8	▲2.5
FDP	Matthias Unger	1,688	7.6	▲1.3	1,632	7.2	▲0.8
Left	Franziska Leschewitz	1,385	6.3	▼0.1	1,344	5.9	▼0.8
Tierschutzpartei	Aida Paola Spiegeler Castañeda	1,175	5.3		758	3.3	▲0.7
Team Todenhöfer					394	1.7	
PARTEI	Carsten Rengert	525	2.4	▲0.7	364	1.6	▲0.4
dieBasis	Peter Schröter	429	1.9		285	1.3	
The Grays					210	0.9	
APT					191	0.8	
FW					188	0.8	
Gray Panthers					161	0.7	▼0.8
Pirates					121	0.5	▼0.8
Volt					105	0.5	
Verjüngungsforschung					77	0.3	▼0.2
Mieterpartei					64	0.3	
Bildet Berlin!					52	0.2	
ÖDP	Andreas Schaefer	85	0.4		48	0.2	
du.					41	0.2	
NPD					35	0.2	▼0.5
Humanists					33	0.1	
LKR	Nicola Jädicke	41	0.2		24	0.1	▼0.3
Klimaliste					21	0.1	
The Pinks/Alliance 21					19	0.1	
DKP					14	0.1	▼0.1
BüSo					11	0.0	Steady
Bergpartei, die ÜberPartei					6	0.0	
SGP					3	0.0	Steady
Informal votes		394			322		
Total valid votes		22,093			22,708		
Turnout		23,048	67.9	▲7.5			
SPD hold	Majority	752	3.4				

== See also ==
- Politics of Berlin
- House of Representatives of Berlin
