= Lichtenberg 2 =

State electoral district of Germany

- Electoral district for the Berlin House of Representatives
- Lichtenberg 2 in 2026
- District: Lichtenberg
- Electorate: 32,875 (2026)

Current electoral district
- Party: CDU
- Member: Martin Pätzold

Lichtenberg 2 is an electoral constituency (German: Wahlkreis) represented in the House of Representatives of Berlin. It elects one member via first-past-the-post voting.

== Geography ==
The constituency comprises the areas of Malchow, Neu-Hohenschönhausen west of Zingster Straße, Alt-Hohenschönhausen up to Sportforum, Konrad-Wolf-Straße, Sandinostraße, and Landsberger Allee. It is entirely within the borough of Lichtenberg.

There were 32,875 eligible voters in 2026.

== Members ==
Election	Member	Party	%
2006	Peter-Rudolf Zotl	The Left	41.4
2011	Wolfgang Albers	The Left	34.0
2016	Wolfgang Albers	The Left	29.1
2021	Martin Pätzold	CDU	21.3
2023	Martin Pätzold	CDU	39.5
2026	Martin Pätzold	CDU	28.3

== Election results ==
=== 2026 election ===
State election (2026): Lichtenberg 2
Notes:	Blue background denotes the winner of the electorate vote. Pink background denotes a candidate elected from their party list. Yellow background denotes an electorate win by a list member, or other incumbent. A ✓ or ✗ denotes status of any incumbent, win or lose respectively.						
Party	Candidate	Votes	%	±%	Party votes	%	±%
CDU	✓ Martin Pätzold	6,622	28.3	▼11.2	4,396	18.7	▼15.9
AfD	Marianne Kleinert	6,259	26.7	▲12.0	6,706	28.5	▲13.2
Left	Toni Kraus	5,642	24.1	▲7.2	5,578	23.7	▲7.8
SPD	Stefan Schenck	1,574	6.7	▼7.8	1,852	7.9	▼7.1
BSW	Johann Geißler	1,313	5.6		1,807	7.7	
Greens	Kristin Otto	1,165	5.0	▼1.5	1,386	5.9	▼1.0
APT					667	2.8	▼0.2
Volt	Nico Gramenz	464	2.0		371	1.6	▲1.0
FDP	Rico Apitz	360	1.5	▼0.7	410	1.7	▼1.1
PARTEI					155	0.7	▼0.5
PdF					100	0.4	
HEIMAT					49	0.2	▲0.1
DKP					40	0.2	▼0.2
ÖDP					31	0.1	Steady
du.					19	0.1	▼0.1
SGP					4	0.0	Steady
Informal votes		531			359		
Total valid votes		23,399			23,571		
Turnout		23,930	72.8	▲12.0			
CDU hold	Majority	363	1.6	▼21.0			

=== 2023 repeat election ===
Changes denoted below for the 2023 election are compared to the 2016 election, as the 2021 election was declared invalid.

State election (2023): Lichtenberg 2
Notes:	Blue background denotes the winner of the electorate vote. Pink background denotes a candidate elected from their party list. Yellow background denotes an electorate win by a list member, or other incumbent. A ✓ or ✗ denotes status of any incumbent, win or lose respectively.						
Party	Candidate	Votes	%	±%	Party votes	%	±%
CDU	Martin Pätzold	7,762	39.5	▲24.4	6,820	34.6	▲20.3
Left	Robert Schneider	3,324	16.9	▼12.2	3,129	15.9	▼11.2
AfD	Gisela Starke-Kleese	2,906	14.8	▼7.4	3,014	15.3	▼6.4
SPD	Dirk Liebe	2,853	14.5	▼5.7	2,943	14.9	▼3.5
Greens	Andrea Nakoinz	1,279	6.5	▲1.6	1,357	6.9	▲2.0
APT	Elke Weihusen	751	3.8		588	3.0	▲0.8
FDP	Rico Apitz	447	2.3	▼1.1	563	2.9	▼0.3
PARTEI					233	1.2	Steady
The Grays					130	0.7	
Gray Panthers					124	0.6	▼0.6
Volt					105	0.5	
Verjüngungsforschung					87	0.4	▼0.5
FW	Ralf Wurzel	209	1.1		82	0.4	
dieBasis	Gabriele Groll	135	0.7		87	0.4	
Pirates					76	0.4	▼0.9
DKP					70	0.4	Steady
Mieterpartei					62	0.3	
Team Todenhöfer					35	0.2	
Humanists					34	0.2	
Bildet Berlin!					33	0.2	
NPD					30	0.2	▼0.1
du.					29	0.1	
Klimaliste					23	0.1	
ÖDP					17	0.1	
The Pinks/Alliance 21					10	0.1	
BüSo					9	0.0	Steady
SGP					9	0.0	▼0.1
Bergpartei, die ÜberPartei					8	0.0	
LKR					8	0.0	▼0.4
Informal votes		196			150		
Total valid votes		19,666			19,715		
Turnout		19,879	60.8	▼2.5			
CDU gain from Left	Majority	4,438	22.6				

== See also ==
- Politics of Berlin
- House of Representatives of Berlin
