= Charlottenburg-Wilmersdorf 5 =

State electoral district of Germany

- Electoral district for the Berlin House of Representatives
- Charlottenburg-Wilmersdorf 5 in 2026
- District: Charlottenburg-Wilmersdorf
- Electorate: 30,755 (2026)

Current electoral district
- Party: CDU
- Member: Sandra Khalatbari

Charlottenburg-Wilmersdorf 5 is an electoral constituency (German: Wahlkreis) represented in the House of Representatives of Berlin. It elects one member via first-past-the-post voting.

== Geography ==
The constituency comprises the districts of Halensee and Grunewald, as well as the western part of the district of Wilmersdorf, within the borough of Charlottenburg-Wilmersdorf.

There were 30,755 eligible voters in 2026.

== Members ==
Election	Member	Party	%
1999	Ekkehard Wruck	CDU	52.7
2001	Peter Kurth	CDU	36.9
2006	Klaus Wowereit	SPD	40.5
2011	Claudio Jupe	CDU	37.8
2016	Claudio Jupe	CDU	28.6
2021	Sandra Khalabari	CDU	29.6
2023	Sandra Khalabari	CDU	42.3
2026	Sandra Khalabari	CDU	35.5

== Election results ==
=== 2026 election ===
State election (2026): Charlottenburg-Wilmersdorf 5
Notes:	Blue background denotes the winner of the electorate vote. Pink background denotes a candidate elected from their party list. Yellow background denotes an electorate win by a list member, or other incumbent. A ✓ or ✗ denotes status of any incumbent, win or lose respectively.						
Party	Candidate	Votes	%	±%	Party votes	%	±%
CDU	✓ Sandra Khalabari	8,123	35.5	▼6.8	7,822	34.0	▼5.1
Greens	Anna Melnik	3,763	16.4	▼0.2	3,331	14.5	▼1.5
SPD	Claudia Buß	3,347	14.6	▼5.4	3,120	13.5	▼5.3
Left	Kyla Grigoleit	2,830	12.4	▲8.1	3,318	14.4	▲9.2
AfD	Stefan Paege	2,379	10.4	▲5.3	2,472	10.7	▲5.3
FDP	Christoph Meyer	1,376	6.0	▼1.8	1,358	5.9	▼4.0
BSW	Dmitrij Dementev	582	2.5		645	2.8	
Volt	Joshua Heitzler	479	2.1		520	2.3	▲1.4
Tierschutzpartei					285	1.2	▼0.3
PARTEI					81	0.4	▼0.5
PdF					46	0.2	
ÖDP					17	0.1	Steady
DKP					10	0.0	Steady
du.					8	0.0	▼0.1
SGP					5	0.0	Steady
Informal votes		357			198		
Total valid votes		22,879			23,038		
Turnout		23,236	75.6	▲9.4			
CDU hold	Majority	4,360	19.1	▼3.1			

=== 2023 repeat election ===
Changes denoted below for the 2023 election are compared to the 2016 election, as the 2021 election was declared invalid.

State election (2023): Charlottenburg-Wilmersdorf 5
Notes:	Blue background denotes the winner of the electorate vote. Pink background denotes a candidate elected from their party list. Yellow background denotes an electorate win by a list member, or other incumbent. A ✓ or ✗ denotes status of any incumbent, win or lose respectively.						
Party	Candidate	Votes	%	±%	Party votes	%	±%
CDU	Sandra Khalabari	8,359	42.3	▲13.7	7,729	39.0	▲14.2
SPD	Claudia Buß	3,961	20.1	▼4.6	3,727	18.8	▼1.5
Greens	Dagmar Kempf	3,289	16.7	▲2.5	3,162	16.0	▲1.2
FDP	Maximilian Rexrodt	1,553	7.9	▼6.0	1,951	9.9	▼7.0
AfD	Andreas Heinzgen	1,012	5.1	▼5.6	1,070	5.4	▼5.5
Left	Anna Voswinckel	842	4.3	▼2.4	1,034	5.2	▼1.9
Tierschutzpartei	Sylvia Karin Freund	386	2.0		309	1.6	▲0.2
Volt					176	0.9	
PARTEI	Lennart Quirin Schwerfeger	235	1.2		172	0.9	▼0.1
dieBasis	Friederike Adelheid Masz	104	0.5		77	0.4	
Team Todenhöfer					53	0.3	
Gray Panthers					41	0.2	▼0.4
Pirates					39	0.2	▼0.7
The Grays					34	0.2	
Mieterpartei					31	0.2	
Humanists					29	0.1	
Klimaliste					25	0.1	
Verjüngungsforschung					23	0.1	▼0.1
FW					23	0.1	
du.					19	0.1	
ÖDP					11	0.1	
DKP					10	0.1	Steady
Bildet Berlin!					10	0.1	
New Democrats					9	0.0	
The Pinks/Alliance 21					9	0.0	
Bergpartei, die ÜberPartei					8	0.0	
LKR	Silvio Wranik	10	0.1		5	0.0	▼0.5
SGP					4	0.0	Steady
NPD					3	0.0	▼0.1
BüSo					3	0.0	Steady
German Conservative					0	0.0	
Informal votes		124			91		
Total valid votes		19,751			19,796		
Turnout		19,904	66.1	▼4.2			
CDU hold	Majority	4,398	22.2				

=== 2021 election (annulled) ===
The election in 2021 was annulled and rerun in 2023.

State election (2021): Charlottenburg-Wilmersdorf 5
Notes:	Blue background denotes the winner of the electorate vote. Pink background denotes a candidate elected from their party list. Yellow background denotes an electorate win by a list member, or other incumbent. A ✓ or ✗ denotes status of any incumbent, win or lose respectively.						
Party	Candidate	Votes	%	±%	Party votes	%	±%
CDU	Sandra Khalabari	7,000	30.0	▲1.4	6,501	27.8	▲3.0
SPD	Claudia Buß	5,244	22.5	▼2.2	4,958	21.2	▲0.9
Greens	Dagmar Kempf	4,224	18.1	▲4.0	4,104	17.6	▲2.8
FDP	Maximilian Rexrodt	3,109	13.3	▼0.5	3,269	14.0	▼2.8
Left	Anna Voswinckel	1,210	5.2	▼1.4	1,490	6.4	▼0.8
AfD	Andreas Heinzgen	1,052	4.5	▼6.2	1,159	5.0	▼6.0
Tierschutzpartei	Sylvia Karin Freund	509	2.2		333	1.4	▲0.1
Volt					255	1.1	
FW	?	333	1.4		182	0.8	
PARTEI	Lennart Quirin Schwerfeger	311	1.3		231	1.0	Steady
dieBasis	Friederike Adelheid Masz	306	1.3		247	1.1	
Team Todenhöfer					132	0.6	
The Grays					78	0.3	
Gray Panthers					75	0.3	▼0.3
APT					60	0.3	
Pirates					49	0.2	▼0.7
Klimaliste					46	0.2	
Mieterpartei					35	0.1	
Humanists					29	0.1	
du.					28	0.1	
Verjüngungsforschung					19	0.1	▼0.2
Bildet Berlin!					18	0.1	
ÖDP					17	0.1	
LKR	Silvio Wranik	17	0.1		14	0.1	
Bergpartei, die ÜberPartei					11	0.0	
New Democrats					10	0.0	
DKP					8	0.0	Steady
NPD					8	0.0	▼0.1
SGP					5	0.0	Steady
BüSo					3	0.0	Steady
The Pinks/Alliance 21					2	0.0	
German Conservative					1	0.0	
Informal votes		277			205		
Total valid votes		23,315			23,377		
Turnout		23,632	78.1	▲7.8			
CDU hold	Majority	1,756	7.5				

== See also ==
- Politics of Berlin
- House of Representatives of Berlin
