= Pankow 2 =

State electoral district of Germany

- Electoral district for the Berlin House of Representatives
- Pankow 2 in 2026
- District: Pankow
- Electorate: 33,681 (2026)

Current electoral district
- Party: CDU
- Member: Lars Bocian

Pankow 2 is an electoral constituency (German: Wahlkreis) represented in the House of Representatives of Berlin. It elects one member via first-past-the-post voting.

== Geography ==
The constituency comprises the areas of Blankenfelde, Rosenthal, Wilhelmsruh, and the northern part of Niderschönhausen within the borough of Pankow.

There were 33,681 eligible voters in 2026.

== Members ==
Election	Member	Party	%
2006	Torsten Hilse	SPD	36.0
2011	Alex Lubawinski	SPD	33.6
2016	Torsten Hofer	SPD	23.3
2021	Torsten Hofer	SPD	22.7
2023	Lars Bocian	CDU	31.4
2026	Lars Bocian	CDU	25.0

== Election results ==
=== 2026 election ===
State election (2026): Pankow 2
Notes:	Blue background denotes the winner of the electorate vote. Pink background denotes a candidate elected from their party list. Yellow background denotes an electorate win by a list member, or other incumbent. A ✓ or ✗ denotes status of any incumbent, win or lose respectively.						
Party	Candidate	Votes	%	±%	Party votes	%	±%
CDU	✓ Lars Bocian	6,605	25.0	▼6.4	5,179	19.5	▼10.1
AfD	Jan-Philip Streeck	5,518	20.9	▲8.0	5,758	21.7	▲8.7
Left	Coco Aglibut	4,795	18.2	▲7.3	5,298	20.0	▲8.1
Greens	Sebastian Kascha	4,022	15.2	▼0.1	3,607	13.6	▼0.6
SPD	Torsten Hofer	2,899	11.0	▼8.1	2,870	10.8	▼6.7
BSW	Oliver Nevi	1,329	5.0		1,498	5.7	
FDP	David Sittner	642	2.4	▼1.4	744	2.8	▼1.6
Tierschutzpartei					662	2.5	▲0.2
Volt	Beate Bluhm	564	2.1		513	1.9	▲1.2
PARTEI					185	0.7	▼0.6
PdF					93	0.4	
ÖDP					48	0.2	Steady
DKP					27	0.1	Steady
du.					23	0.1	▼0.1
SGP					6	0.0	Steady
Informal votes		417			280		
Total valid votes		26,374			26,511		
Turnout		26,791	79.5	▲10.3			
CDU hold	Majority	1,087	4.1	▼8.2			

=== 2023 repeat election ===
Changes denoted below for the 2023 election are compared to the 2016 election, as the 2021 election was declared invalid.

State election (2023): Pankow 2
Notes:	Blue background denotes the winner of the electorate vote. Pink background denotes a candidate elected from their party list. Yellow background denotes an electorate win by a list member, or other incumbent. A ✓ or ✗ denotes status of any incumbent, win or lose respectively.						
Party	Candidate	Votes	%	±%	Party votes	%	±%
CDU	Lars Bocian	7,057	31.4	▲11.6	6,660	29.6	▲11.9
SPD	✗ Torsten Hofer	4,297	19.1	▼4.2	3,951	17.6	▼3.4
Greens	Susanne Jahn	3,439	15.3	▲4.1	3,205	14.2	▲3.1
AfD	Ronald Gläser	2,909	12.9	▼6.0	2,938	13.1	▼5.8
Left	Matthias Zarbock	2,442	10.9	▼7.0	2,678	11.9	▼5.9
FDP	Felix Reifschneider	851	3.8	▼0.8	1,000	4.4	▼0.6
Tierschutzpartei	Vera Naumburger	648	2.9		514	2.3	▲0.5
PARTEI	Uwe Dähn	377	1.7	▼0.1	297	1.3	▼0.1
dieBasis	Dieter Bonitz	242	1.1		171	0.8	
Volt					171	0.8	
The Grays					145	0.6	
Gray Panthers					130	0.6	▼0.9
FW	Frank Kirstein	206	0.9		88	0.4	
Verjüngungsforschung					82	0.4	▼0.3
Mieterpartei					70	0.3	
Team Todenhöfer					68	0.3	
Pirates					56	0.2	▼1.0
Klimaliste					46	0.2	
Humanists					42	0.2	
Bildet Berlin!					31	0.1	
du.					31	0.1	
DKP					31	0.1	▼0.1
ÖDP					30	0.1	
NPD					21	0.1	▼0.4
Bergpartei, die ÜberPartei					13	0.1	
SGP					11	0.0	Steady
LKR					10	0.0	▼0.5
The Pinks/Alliance 21					10	0.0	
BüSo					6	0.0	Steady
Informal votes		178			146		
Total valid votes		22,468			22,506		
Turnout		22,668	69.2	▼2.1			
CDU gain from SPD	Majority	2,760	12.3				

=== 2021 election (annulled) ===
The election in 2021 was annulled and rerun in 2023.

State election (2021): Pankow 2
Notes:	Blue background denotes the winner of the electorate vote. Pink background denotes a candidate elected from their party list. Yellow background denotes an electorate win by a list member, or other incumbent. A ✓ or ✗ denotes status of any incumbent, win or lose respectively.						
Party	Candidate	Votes	%	±%	Party votes	%	±%
SPD	Torsten Hofer	5,692	22.6	▼0.7	5,421	21.4	▲0.4
CDU	Lars Bocian	5,182	20.6	▲0.8	4,744	18.8	▲1.0
Alliance /The Greens	Susanne Jahn	4,194	16.7	▲5.4	3,828	15.1	▲4.0
Left	Matthias Zarbock	3,156	12.6	▼5.3	3,379	13.4	▼4.4
AfD	Ronald Gläser	2,732	10.9	▼8.1	2,770	11.0	▼7.9
FDP	Felix Reifschneider	1,769	7.0	▲2.4	1,893	7.5	▲2.5
Tierschutzpartei	Vera Naumburger	881	3.5		584	2.3	▲0.5
dieBasis	Dieter Bonitz	523	2.1		397	1.6	
FW	Frank Kirstein	511	2.0		317	1.3	
PARTEI	Uwe Dähn	492	2.0	▲0.1	401	1.6	▲0.2
The Grays					369	1.5	
Volt					236	0.9	
Gray Panthers					156	0.6	▼0.8
Team Todenhöfer					134	0.5	
APT					104	0.4	
Verjüngungsforschung					92	0.4	▼0.3
Pirates					92	0.4	▼0.9
Mieterpartei					79	0.3	
Klimaliste					54	0.2	
Humanists					48	0.2	
Bildet Berlin!					35	0.1	
du.					29	0.1	
ÖDP					23	0.1	
NPD					22	0.1	▼0.5
DKP					21	0.1	▼0.1
LKR					17	0.1	▼0.5
Bergpartei, die ÜberPartei					15	0.1	
The Pinks/Alliance 21					14	0.1	
SGP					4	0.0	▼0.1
BüSo					3	0.0	▼0.1
Informal votes		267			172		
Total valid votes		25,132			25,281		
Turnout		25,492	77.3	▲6.0			
SPD hold	Majority	510	2.0				

== See also ==
- Politics of Berlin
- House of Representatives of Berlin
