= Mitte 5 =

State electoral district of Germany

- Electoral district for the Berlin House of Representatives
- Mitte 5 in 2026
- District: Mitte
- Electorate: 27,912 (2026)

Current electoral district
- Party: The Left
- Member: Andreas Umgelter

Mitte 5 is an electoral constituency (German: Wahlkreis) represented in the House of Representatives of Berlin. It elects one member via first-past-the-post voting.

== Geography ==
The constituency comprises the areas of Schillerpark and Rehberge within the borough of Mitte.

There were 27,912 eligible voters in 2023.

== Members ==
Election	Member	Party	%
2006	Bruni Wildenhein-Lauterbach	SPD	40.3
2011	Bruni Wildenhein-Lauterbach	SPD	33.8
2016	Bruni Wildenhein-Lauterbach	SPD	26.2
2021	Mathias Schulz	SPD	25.6
2023	Sven Rissmann	CDU	24.4
2026	Andreas Umgelter	Left	36.4

== Election results ==
=== 2026 election ===
State election (2026): Mitte 1
Notes:	Blue background denotes the winner of the electorate vote. Pink background denotes a candidate elected from their party list. Yellow background denotes an electorate win by a list member, or other incumbent. A ✓ or ✗ denotes status of any incumbent, win or lose respectively.						
Party	Candidate	Votes	%	±%	Party votes	%	±%
Left	Andreas Umgelter	6,631	36.4	▲22.5	6,842	37.1	▲23.1
Greens	Alexandra Bendzko	2,745	15.1	▼7.4	2,347	12.7	▼8.9
SPD	Mathias Schulz	2,526	13.9	▼6/7	2,277	12.4	▼6.1
CDU	✗ Sven Nico Rissmann	2,54	13.8	▼10.7	2,414	13.1	▼11.0
AfD	Julian Adrat	2,401	13.2	▲4.6	2,404	13.0	▲4.5
BSW	Jean-Marie Ayikpe	764	4.2		795	4.3	
Tierschutzpartei					382		
FDP	Bettina von Seyfried	314	1.7	▼1.1	366	2.0	▼1.2
Volt	Andrija Šarić	314	1.7		298	1.6	▲0.7
PARTEI					155	0.8	▼0.8
PdF					68	0.4	
DKP					35	0.2	Steady
ÖDP					17	0.1	
du.					16	0.1	▼0.2
SGP					13	0.1	Steady
Informal votes		480			250		
Total valid votes		18,199			18,429		
Turnout		18,679	66.9	▲12.2			
Left gain from CDU	Majority	3,886	21.3				

=== 2023 repeat election ===
Changes denoted below for the 2023 election are compared to the 2016 election, as the 2021 election was declared invalid.

State election (2023): Mitte 5
Notes:	Blue background denotes the winner of the electorate vote. Pink background denotes a candidate elected from their party list. Yellow background denotes an electorate win by a list member, or other incumbent. A ✓ or ✗ denotes status of any incumbent, win or lose respectively.						
Party	Candidate	Votes	%	±%	Party votes	%	±%
CDU	Sven Nico Rissmann	3,640	24.4	▲8.5	3,586	24.1	▲8.3
Greens	Ario Ebrahimpour Mirzaie	3,353	22.5	▲2.5	3,226	21.7	▲5.1
SPD	✗ Mathias Schulz	3,069	20.6	▼5.5	2,742	18.4	▼6.4
Left	Simon Gückel	2,076	13.9	▲0.5	2,096	14.1	▲0.6
AfD	Franz Kerker	1,280	8.6	▼5.7	1,266	8.5	▼5.0
Tierschutzpartei	Friederike Nabrdalik	513	3.4		406	2.7	▲0.7
FDP	Șeyda-Gül Türk	424	2.8	▼2.0	470	3.2	▼1.7
PARTEI	Stefan Schmid	298	2.0		243	1.6	▼1.3
Volt					136	0.9	
Team Todenhöfer					115	0.8	
Klimaliste					72	0.5	
dieBasis	Michael Bilin	121	0.8		71	0.5	
Pirates	Theresa Lehnen	120	0.8	▼2.2	69	0.5	▼1.8
Gray Panthers					69	0.5	▼1.2
The Grays					64	0.4	
Mieterpartei					42	0.3	
du.					38	0.3	
Verjüngungsforschung					36	0.2	▼0.1
Humanists					34	0.2	
DKP					32	0.2	Steady
Bergpartei, die ÜberPartei					19	0.1	
FW					19	0.1	
Bildet Berlin!					9	0.1	
ÖDP					9	0.1	
NPD					9	0.1	▼0.3
The Pinks/Alliance 21					7	0.0	
SGP					5	0.0	▼0.2
BüSo					4	0.0	▼0.1
LKR					3	0.0	▼0.2
Informal votes		148			130		
Total valid votes		14,894			14,897		
Turnout		15,052	54.7	▼4.0			
CDU gain from SPD	Majority	287	1.9				

=== 2021 election (annulled) ===
The election in 2021 was annulled and rerun in 2023.

State election (2021): Mitte 5
Notes:	Blue background denotes the winner of the electorate vote. Pink background denotes a candidate elected from their party list. Yellow background denotes an electorate win by a list member, or other incumbent. A ✓ or ✗ denotes status of any incumbent, win or lose respectively.						
Party	Candidate	Votes	%	±%	Party votes	%	±%
SPD	Mathias Schulz	4,765	25.6	▼0.6	4,266	22.8	▼2.0
Greens	Ario Ebrahimpour Mirzaie	4,117	22.1	▲2.1	3,838	20.5	▲4.0
Left	Simon Gückel	2,888	15.5	▲2.1	2,940	15.7	▲2.3
CDU	Sven Nico Rissmann	2,765	14.8	▼1.1	2,624	14.0	▼1.8
AfD	Franz Kerker	1,469	7.9	▼6.4	1,422	7.6	▼5.9
FDP	Șeyda-Gül Türk	938	5.0	▲0.2	959	5.1	▲0.3
Tierschutzpartei	Friederike Nabrdalik	760	4.1		468	2.5	▲0.5
Team Todenhöfer					375	2.0	
PARTEI	Stefan Schmid	427	2.3		360	1.9	▼1.0
dieBasis	Michael Bilin	326	1.8		236	1.3	
Volt					197	1.1	
Klimaliste					151	0.8	
The Grays					121	0.6	
FW					110	0.6	
Gray Panthers					107	0.6	▼1.1
Pirates	Theresa Lehnen	168	0.9	▼2.1	102	0.5	▼1.7
APT					72	0.4	
du.					61	0.3	
Humanists					54	0.3	
Mieterpartei					51	0.3	
Bergpartei, die ÜberPartei					38	0.2	
Verjüngungsforschung					38	0.2	▼0.2
DKP					34	0.2	Steady
ÖDP					24	0.1	
Bildet Berlin!					17	0.1	
NPD					16	0.1	▼0.3
The Pinks/Alliance 21					10	0.1	
SGP					5	0.0	▼0.2
BüSo					3	0.0	▼0.1
LKR					3	0.0	▼0.2
Informal votes		316			273		
Total valid votes		18,623			18,702		
Turnout		19,002	68.6	▲10.0			
SPD hold	Majority	648	3.5				

== See also ==
- Politics of Berlin
- House of Representatives of Berlin
