= Steglitz-Zehlendorf 6 =

State electoral district of Germany

- Electoral district for the Berlin House of Representatives
- Steglitz-Zehlendorf 6 in 2026
- District: Steglitz-Zehlendorf
- Electorate: 32,091 (2026)

Current electoral district
- Party: CDU
- Member: Christoph Wegener

Steglitz-Zehlendorf 6 is an electoral constituency (German: Wahlkreis) represented in the House of Representatives of Berlin. It elects one member via first-past-the-post voting.

== Geography ==
The constituency comprises the areas of Clayallee, Thielallee, Pacelliallee, Königin-Luise-Straße, Schützallee, and Onkel-Tom-Straße of the Dahlem district, entirely within the borough of Steglitz-Zehlendorf.

There were 32,091 eligible voters in 2026.

== Members ==
Election	Member	Party	%
1999	Uwe Lehmann-Brauns	CDU	56.7
2001	Karl-Georg Wellmann	CDU	38.2
2006	Uwe Lehmann-Brauns	CDU	38.0
2011	Uwe Lehmann-Brauns	CDU	41.9
2016	Adrian Grasse	CDU	30.3
2021	Adrian Grasse	CDU	31.0
2023	Adrian Grasse	CDU	40.0
2026	Christoph Wegener	CDU	33.7

== Election results ==
=== 2026 election ===
State election (2026): Steglitz-Zehlendorf 6
Notes:	Blue background denotes the winner of the electorate vote. Pink background denotes a candidate elected from their party list. Yellow background denotes an electorate win by a list member, or other incumbent. A ✓ or ✗ denotes status of any incumbent, win or lose respectively.						
Party	Candidate	Votes	%	±%	Party votes	%	±%
CDU	Christoph Wegener	8,840	33.7	▼6.3	8,886	33.7	▼2.9
Greens	Michael Gaedicke	5,599	21.3	▲0.9	4,766	18.1	▼1.1
SPD	Ina Czyborra	4,080	15.5	▼4.4	3,831	14.5	▼4.3
Left	Lara Wiebelt	2,917	11.1	▲6.9	3,486	13.2	▲7.9
AfD	Jonas Hammermeister	2,227	8.5	▲3.9	2,407	9.1	▲4.3
FDP	Tobias Bauschke	1,122	4.3	▼2.5	1,102	4.2	▼5.3
Volt	Susann Kämmer	815	3.1		737	2.8	▲1.8
BSW	Nicolai Röschert	642	2.4		627	2.4	
Tierschutzpartei					356	1.3	▼0.1
PARTEI					103	0.4	▼0.3
PdF					41	0.2	
ÖDP					33	0.1	Steady
DKP					12	0.0	Steady
du.					9	0.0	▼0.1
SGP					3	0.0	Steady
Informal votes		389			232		
Total valid votes		26,242			26,399		
Turnout		26,631	83.0	▲7.5			
CDU hold	Majority	3,241	12.4	▼7.2			

=== 2023 repeat election ===
Changes denoted below for the 2023 election are compared to the 2016 election, as the 2021 election was declared invalid.

State election (2023): Steglitz-Zehlendorf 6
Notes:	Blue background denotes the winner of the electorate vote. Pink background denotes a candidate elected from their party list. Yellow background denotes an electorate win by a list member, or other incumbent. A ✓ or ✗ denotes status of any incumbent, win or lose respectively.						
Party	Candidate	Votes	%	±%	Party votes	%	±%
CDU	✓ Adrian Grasse	9,338	40.0	▲9.6	8,546	36.6	▲10.8
Greens	Torsten Wiesske	4,763	20.4	▲2.3	4,480	19.2	▲1.3
SPD	Ina Maria Czyborra	4,658	19.9	▼3.4	4,400	18.8	▼1.3
FDP	Tobias Bauschke	1,593	6.8	▼4.2	2,2159.5	9.5	▼5.0
AfD	Peer Lars Döhnert	1,073	4.6	▼5.5	1,132	4.8	▼5.3
Left	Mathias Gruner	981	4.2	▼1.2	1,251	5.4	▼1.1
Tierschutzpartei	Tamara Gama Kögler	424	1.8		338	1.4	▲0.1
Volt					225	1.0	
PARTEI	Andreas Frielingsdorf	220	0.9		169	0.7	▼0.2
dieBasis	Markus Jensch	190	0.8		134	0.6	
Pirates	Georg Boroviczény	116	0.5	▼1.1	81	0.3	▼0.7
Gray Panthers					70	0.3	▼0.4
Klimaliste					44	0.2	
The Grays					40	0.2	
FW					38	0.2	
Mieterpartei					33	0.1	
Team Todenhöfer					31	0.1	
ÖDP					30	0.1	
Verjüngungsforschung					28	0.1	▼0.1
Humanists					24	0.1	
du.					20	0.1	
Bildet Berlin!					15	0.1	
Bergpartei, die ÜberPartei					11	0.0	
NPD					7	0.0	▼0.1
BüSo					5	0.0	▼0.1
DKP					5	0.0	Steady
The Pinks/Alliance 21					3	0.0	
LKR					2	0.0	▼0.4
SGP					2	0.0	Steady
Informal votes		23,356			23,379		
Total valid votes		157			117		
Turnout		23,534	75.4	▼3.1			
CDU hold	Majority	4,575	19.6				

=== 2021 election (annulled) ===
The election in 2021 was annulled and rerun in 2023.

State election (2021): Steglitz-Zehlendorf 6
Notes:	Blue background denotes the winner of the electorate vote. Pink background denotes a candidate elected from their party list. Yellow background denotes an electorate win by a list member, or other incumbent. A ✓ or ✗ denotes status of any incumbent, win or lose respectively.						
Party	Candidate	Votes	%	±%	Party votes	%	±%
CDU	✓ Adrian Grasse	8,025	31.0	▲0.7	7,253	27.6	▲1.8
SPD	Ina Maria Czyborra	5,778	22.4	▼1.0	5,385	20.5	▲0.4
Greens	Torsten Wiesske	5,702	22.1	▲3.9	5,466	20.8	▲2.9
FDP	Tobias Bauschke	2,575	10.0	▼1.0	3,215	12.2	▼2.2
Left	Mathias Gruner	1,159	4.5	▼0.9	1,655	6.3	▼0.2
AfD	Peer Lars Döhnert	1,079	4.2	▼5.9	1,122	4.3	▼5.9
Tierschutzpartei	Tamara Gama Kögler	534	2.1		362	1.4	Steady
dieBasis	Markus Jensch	400	1.5		341	1.3	
Volt					329	1.3	
PARTEI	Andreas Frielingsdorf	256	1.0		234	0.9	Steady
FW	?	223	0.9		186	0.7	
Klimaliste					93	0.4	
Pirates	Georg Boroviczény	118	0.5	▼1.2	91	0.3	▼0.7
The Grays					87	0.3	
APT					83	0.3	
Team Todenhöfer					63	0.2	
Gray Panthers					61	0.2	▼0.4
Humanists					46	0.2	
ÖDP					42	0.2	
Mieterpartei					37	0.1	
Verjüngungsforschung					35	0.1	▼0.1
Bildet Berlin!					25	0.1	
du.					18	0.1	
LKR					10	0.0	▼0.4
Bergpartei, die ÜberPartei					9	0.0	
BüSo					7	0.0	▼0.1
DKP					7	0.0	Steady
The Pinks/Alliance 21					7	0.0	
NPD					5	0.0	▼0.1
SGP					4	0.0	Steady
Informal votes		503			148		
Total valid votes		25,849			26,278		
Turnout		26,443	84.6	▲6.0			
CDU hold	Majority	2,247	8.6				

== See also ==
- Politics of Berlin
- House of Representatives of Berlin
