= Pankow 7 =

State electoral district of Germany

- Electoral district for the Berlin House of Representatives
- Pankow 7 in 2026
- District: Pankow
- Electorate: 30,377 (2026)

Current electoral district
- Party: The Left
- Member: Niklas Schrader

Pankow 7 is an electoral constituency (German: Wahlkreis) represented in the House of Representatives of Berlin. It elects one member via first-past-the-post voting.

== Geography ==
The constituency comprises the areas along the S-Bahn line between Greifswalder Straße and Schönhauser Allee , Schönhauser Allee, Wisbyer Straße, Prenzlauer Promenade, Am Steinberg, Pistoriusstraße, Berliner Allee and Greifswalder Straße within the borough of Pankow.

There were 30,377 eligible voters in 2026.

== Members ==
Election	Member	Party	%
2006	Peter Treichel	SPD	32.7
2011	Clara West	SPD	31.3
2016	Clara West	SPD	25.0
2021	Julia Schneider	Green	30.7
2023	Julia Schneider	Green	30.9
2026	Niklas Schrader	Left	32.1

== Election results ==
=== 2026 election ===
State election (2026): Pankow 7
Notes:	Blue background denotes the winner of the electorate vote. Pink background denotes a candidate elected from their party list. Yellow background denotes an electorate win by a list member, or other incumbent. A ✓ or ✗ denotes status of any incumbent, win or lose respectively.						
Party	Candidate	Votes	%	±%	Party votes	%	±%
Left	Niklas Schrader	7,616	32.1	▲13.7	8,346	35.0	▲16.2
Greens	Can Aru	6,159	25.9	▼5.0	4,788	20.1	▼7.4
AfD	Martin Kellner	2,851	12.0	▲4.8	2,873	12.1	▲4.8
CDU	Sabrina Hohl	2,287	9.6	▼6.9	2,426	10.2	▼5.9
SPD	Annette Unger	2,278	9.6	▼5.9	2,282	9.6	▼5.4
BSW	Kim Reichelt	968	4.1		1,037	4.4	
Volt	Theresa Schültken	663	2.8		665	2.8	▲1.4
Tierschutzpartei	Mersija Böhnig	502	2.1	▼1.1	452	1.9	▼0.8
FDP	David Fischer	428	1.8	▼1.3	447	1.9	▼1.7
PARTEI					289	1.2	▼1.2
PdF					79	0.3	
DKP					63	0.3	▲0.1
ÖDP					40	0.2	Steady
du.					22	0.1	▼0.2
SGP					18	0.1	Steady
Informal votes		240			165		
Total valid votes		23,752			23,827		
Turnout		23,992	79.0	▲13.1			
Left gain from Greens	Majority	1,457	6.2				

=== 2023 repeat election ===
Changes denoted below for the 2023 election are compared to the 2016 election, as the 2021 election was declared invalid.

State election (2023): Pankow 7
Notes:	Blue background denotes the winner of the electorate vote. Pink background denotes a candidate elected from their party list. Yellow background denotes an electorate win by a list member, or other incumbent. A ✓ or ✗ denotes status of any incumbent, win or lose respectively.						
Party	Candidate	Votes	%	±%	Party votes	%	±%
Greens	Julia Schneider	5,974	30.9	▲11.4	5,329	27.5	▲7.4
Left	Sandra Brunner	3,552	18.4	▼4.2	3,645	18.8	▼4.3
CDU	Antje Tölle	3,192	16.5	▲6.2	3,114	16.1	▲6.1
SPD	Annette Unger	3,003	15.5	▼9.5	2,893	14.9	▼4.8
AfD	Fred Gornig	1,390	7.2	▼4.9	1,412	7.3	▼4.3
Tierschutzpartei	Isabell Huwe	617	3.2		524	2.7	▲0.6
PARTEI	Madlen Suchardt	616	3.2	▼0.7	460	2.4	▼1.1
FDP	Julius Grottke	594	3.1	▼0.5	693	3.6	▼0.4
Volt					261	1.3	
dieBasis	Annette Becker	255	1.3		202	1.0	
Klimaliste					92	0.5	
Pirates					90	0.5	▼2.2
The Grays					86	0.4	
Mieterpartei					82	0.4	
Gray Panthers					63	0.3	▼0.6
Team Todenhöfer					53	0.3	
FW	Jan Mettchen	138	0.7		52	0.3	
Verjüngungsforschung					51	0.3	▼0.3
du.					50	0.3	
Humanists					44	0.2	
DKP					37	0.2	
Bildet Berlin!					32	0.2	
ÖDP					30	0.2	
Bergpartei, die ÜberPartei					24	0.1	
NPD					22	0.1	▼0.4
The Pinks/Alliance 21					12	0.1	
SGP					10	0.1	▼0.1
BüSo					8	0.0	▼0.1
LKR					7	0.0	▼0.3
Informal votes		19,331			19,378		
Total valid votes		119			90		
Turnout		19,477	65.8	▼1.6			
Greens gain from SPD	Majority	2,422	12.5				

=== 2021 election (annulled) ===
The election in 2021 was annulled and rerun in 2023.

State election (2021): Pankow 7
Notes:	Blue background denotes the winner of the electorate vote. Pink background denotes a candidate elected from their party list. Yellow background denotes an electorate win by a list member, or other incumbent. A ✓ or ✗ denotes status of any incumbent, win or lose respectively.						
Party	Candidate	Votes	%	±%	Party votes	%	±%
Alliance /The Greens	Julia Schneider	7,136	30.7	▲11.3	6,431	27.4	▲7.2
Left	Sandra Brunner	4,684	20.2	▼2.4	5,017	21.4	▼1.7
SPD	Annette Unger	4,208	18.1	▼6.9	3,837	16.3	▼3.4
CDU	Antje Tölle	2,196	9.5	▼0.8	2,137	9.1	▼0.8
AfD	Fred Gornig	1,505	6.5	▼5.6	1,505	6.4	▼5.2
FDP	Julius Grottke	1,178	5.1	▲1.5	1,318	5.6	▲1.7
PARTEI	Madlen Suchardt	837	3.6	▼0.3	652	2.8	▼0.7
Tierschutzpartei	Isabell Huwe	695	3.0		464	2.0	▼0.1
dieBasis	Annette Becker	509	2.2		422	1.8	
Volt					368	1.6	
FW	Jan Mettchen	260	1.1		180	0.8	
The Grays					146	0.6	
Klimaliste					138	0.6	
Pirates					122	0.5	▼2.1
Mieterpartei					106	0.5	
Gray Panthers					85	0.4	▼0.5
Team Todenhöfer					78	0.3	
Humanists					67	0.3	
APT					66	0.3	
Verjüngungsforschung					65	0.3	▼0.3
du.					64	0.3	
Bergpartei, die ÜberPartei					53	0.2	
Bildet Berlin!					38	0.2	
DKP					33	0.1	▼0.1
NPD					28	0.1	▼0.4
ÖDP					25	0.1	
LKR					13	0.1	▼0.2
The Pinks/Alliance 21					13	0.1	
BüSo					7	0.0	▼0.1
SGP					3	0.0	▼0.2
Informal votes		331			150		
Total valid votes		23,208			23,481		
Turnout		23,654	79.2	▲11.8			
Greens gain from SPD	Majority	2,452	10.5				

== See also ==
- Politics of Berlin
- House of Representatives of Berlin
