= Dennis Haustein =

German politician (born 1990)

Member of the Abgeordnetenhaus of Berlin
- Incumbent
- Assumed office 2023

Personal details
- Born: 2 March 1990 (age 36) Potsdam, Germany
- Party: Christian Democratic Union

Dennis Haustein (born 2 March 1990) is a German politician from the Christian Democratic Union of Germany (CDU) and has been a member of the Abgeordnetenhaus of Berlin since 2023.

== Biography ==
Haustein grew up in Dahlewitz as a twin in a working-class family of six. He attended Dahlewitz Elementary School, Wünsdorf Secondary School, and graduated from the Fontane Gymnasium in Rangsdorf in 2009. He completed his nine-month civilian service with the Prussian Palaces and Gardens Foundation Berlin-Brandenburg in garden and landscape maintenance and then moved to Berlin. From 2010 to January 2013, he completed vocational training as a personnel services specialist. He then worked as a personnel consultant until 2016. Around 2016, he moved to the Lichtenberg district of Berlin. From 2016 to 2021, he was responsible for establishing and managing a branch of a personnel consulting firm. From December 2021, Haustein worked as a manager at BASF. His employment has been suspended since April 1, 2023, due to his membership in the Berlin House of Representatives.

== Political career ==
Haustein has been a member of the CDU since 2010 and of the Young Union since 2016. Since 2019, he has been chairman of the CDU local association Lichtenberg-Mitte, joined the Mittelstands- und Wirtschaftsunion (SME and Economic Union) in 2022 and the LSU Federal Association in 2023.

From 2021 to 2023, Haustein was a member of the Berlin-Lichtenberg district assembly. There he belonged to the CDU Fraktion and was spokesperson for transport, labor, social affairs and health.

Haustein ran in the 2021 Berlin state election in the Lichtenberg 3 constituency but failed to win a seat. In the 2023 repeat election, he won the direct mandate in the Lichtenberg 3 constituency by ten votes and entered the Abgeordnetenhaus. An appeal by the losing candidate was rejected by the Constitutional Court of the State of Berlin in November 2023 by a vote of 7 to 1.

In the Abgeordnetenhaus of Berlin, Haustein is a member of the main committee, its subcommittee on assets, and the committee on culture, civic engagement, and the promotion of democracy. He is the CDU parliamentary group's spokesperson for civic engagement and the promotion of democracy.

== Memberships ==
- Fennpfuhl Citizens' Association
- Association of supporters of the Tierpark Berlin and Berlin Zoo
- Frischluft e. V. (Federal Chairman)
- Campus für Demokratie Support Association
- Friends of the Lichtenberg Libraries
- Friends of the Lichtenberg Museum in the Town Hall
- Verein Deutsche Sprache

== See also ==
- List of members of the 19th Abgeordnetenhaus of Berlin (2023–2026)
