= Lichtenberg 1 =

State electoral district of Germany

- Electoral district for the Berlin House of Representatives
- Lichtenberg 1 in 2026
- District: Lichtenberg
- Electorate: 34,019 (2026)

Current electoral district
- Party: AfD
- Member: Stephan Knaute

Lichtenberg 1 is an electoral constituency (German: Wahlkreis) represented in the House of Representatives of Berlin. It elects one member via first-past-the-post voting.

== Geography ==
The constituency comprises the areas of Wartenberg, Falkenberg, and Neu-Hohenschönhausen between Hectgraben and Rüdickenstraße. It is entirely within the borough of Lichtenberg.

There were 34,019 eligible voters in 2026.

== Members ==
Election	Member	Party	%
2006	Evrim Sommer (Baba)	The Left	38.6
2011	Evrim Sommer (Baba)	The Left	34.7
2016	Kay Nerstheimer	AfD	26.0
2021	Danny Freymark	CDU	25.5
2023	Danny Freymark	CDU	40.8
2026	Stephan Knaute	AfD	33.6

== Election results ==
=== 2026 election ===
State election (2026): Lichtenberg 1
Notes:	Blue background denotes the winner of the electorate vote. Pink background denotes a candidate elected from their party list. Yellow background denotes an electorate win by a list member, or other incumbent. A ✓ or ✗ denotes status of any incumbent, win or lose respectively.						
Party	Candidate	Votes	%	±%	Party votes	%	±%
AfD	Stephan Knaute	7,536	33.6	▲13.6	8,242	36.2	▲15.3
CDU	✗ Danny Freymark	6,937	30.9	▼9.9	3,942	17.3	▼17.3
Left	Christoph Harting	4,353	19.4	▲4.0	4,709	20.7	▲6.3
BSW	Bastian Sieber	1,332	5.9		1,813	8.0	
SPD	Klaus-Uwe Heinecke	1,177	5.2	▼7.2	1,506	6.6	▼7.4
Tierschutzpartei					813	3.6	▲0.3
Greens	Tim Junge	595	2.7	▼1.2	797	3.5	▼0.5
Volt	Tim Basulto	292	1.3		221	1.0	▲0.7
FDP	Christina Collin-Hoebel	227	1.0	▼0.9	282	1.2	▼0.9
PARTEI					153	0.7	▼0.4
PdF					102	0.4	
HEIMAT					59	0.3	Steady
DKP					39	0.2	▼0.1
ÖDP					28	0.1	▲0.1
du.					25	0.1	Steady
SGP					11	0.0	
Informal votes		757			464		
Total valid votes		22,449			22,742		
Turnout		23,206	68.2	▲15.4			
AfD gain from CDU	Majority	599	2.7				

=== 2023 repeat election ===
Changes denoted below for the 2023 election are compared to the 2016 election, as the 2021 election was declared invalid.

Note that Jörg Bier of Free Voters moved away from Berlin, and thus was not on the ballot for the repeat election.

State election (2023): Lichtenberg 1
Notes:	Blue background denotes the winner of the electorate vote. Pink background denotes a candidate elected from their party list. Yellow background denotes an electorate win by a list member, or other incumbent. A ✓ or ✗ denotes status of any incumbent, win or lose respectively.						
Party	Candidate	Votes	%	±%	Party votes	%	±%
CDU	Danny Freymark	7,159	40.8	▲19.9	6,084	34.7	▲19.3
AfD	Karsten Woldeit	3,501	20.0	▼6.0	3,669	20.9	▼5.2
Left	Ines Schmidt	2,694	15.4	▼9.6	2,521	14.4	▼10.0
SPD	Mirko Willbrandt	2,175	12.4	▼3.9	2,461	14.0	▼2.1
Tierschutzpartei	Marie Hartwich	773	4.4		582	3.3	▲0.8
Greens	Jan Fährmann	672	3.8	▲0.2	703	4.0	▲0.7
FDP	Marcel Otto	332	1.9	▼0.1	369	2.1	▲0.1
PARTEI					183	1.0	▼0.2
The Grays					133	0.8	
Gray Panthers					113	0.6	▼1.1
Verjüngungsforschung					99	0.6	▼0.5
dieBasis	Lars-Uwe Kreutz	173	1.0		91	0.5	
Mieterpartei					78	0.4	
Pirates					67	0.4	▼1.1
FW					65	0.4	
Volt					54	0.3	
DKP					49	0.3	Steady
NPD	Kay Nerstheimer	51	0.3	▼1.5	48	0.3	▼1.6
Bildet Berlin!					36	0.2	
Humanists					30	0.2	
Team Todenhöfer					26	0.1	
du.					24	0.1	
Klimaliste					20	0.1	
The Pinks/Alliance 21					13	0.1	
ÖDP					9	0.1	
SGP					8	0.0	▼0.1
Bergpartei, die ÜberPartei					6	0.0	
BüSo					6	0.0	▼0.1
LKR					6	0.0	▼0.4
Informal votes		182			167		
Total valid votes		17,530			17,553		
Turnout		17,734	52.8	▼3.1			
CDU gain from AfD	Majority	3,658	20.8				

=== 2021 election (annulled) ===
The election in 2021 was annulled and rerun in 2023.

State election (2021): Lichtenberg 1
Notes:	Blue background denotes the winner of the electorate vote. Pink background denotes a candidate elected from their party list. Yellow background denotes an electorate win by a list member, or other incumbent. A ✓ or ✗ denotes status of any incumbent, win or lose respectively.						
Party	Candidate	Votes	%	±%	Party votes	%	±%
CDU	Danny Freymark	5,635	25.5	▲4.5	4,372	19.8	▲4.5
Left	Ines Schmidt	4,160	18.8	▼6.2	3,850	17.4	▼7.0
SPD	Mirko Willbrandt	4,145	18.8	▲2.5	4,550	20.6	▲4.5
AfD	Karsten Woldeit	3,920	17.7	▼8.2	3,998	18.1	▼7.9
Greens	Jan Fährmann	1,170	5.3	▲1.7	1,132	5.1	▲1.8
Tierschutzpartei	Marie Hartwich	1,116	5.1		714	3.2	▲0.8
FDP	Marcel Otto	967	4.4	▲2.4	1,045	4.7	▲2.7
PARTEI					343	1.6	▲0.3
The Grays					292	1.3	
FW	Jörg Bier	580	2.6		277	1.3	
dieBasis	Lars-Uwe Kreutz	300	1.4		223	1.0	
Gray Panthers					190	0.9	▼0.8
APT					184	0.8	
Verjüngungsforschung					139	0.6	▼0.5
Pirates					134	0.6	▼0.9
NPD	Kay Nerstheimer	106	0.5	▼1.3	105	0.5	▼1.4
Volt					90	0.4	
Team Todenhöfer					84	0.4	
Mieterpartei					78	0.4	
DKP					68	0.3	Steady
Bildet Berlin!					44	0.2	
Humanists					32	0.1	
ÖDP					26	0.1	
du.					23	0.1	
Klimaliste					18	0.1	
The Pinks/Alliance 21					14	0.1	
LKR					13	0.1	▼0.4
SGP					12	0.1	▼0.1
BüSo					11	0.0	▼0.1
Bergpartei, die ÜberPartei					8	0.0	
Informal votes		392			331		
Total valid votes		22,099			22,069		
Turnout		22,555	66.7	▲10.8			
CDU gain from AfD	Majority	1,475	6.7				

== See also ==
- Politics of Berlin
- House of Representatives of Berlin
