= Pankow 4 =

State electoral district of Germany

- Electoral district for the Berlin House of Representatives
- Pankow 4 in 2026
- District: Pankow
- Electorate: 29,178 (2026)

Current electoral district
- Party: AfD
- Member: Herbert Mohr

Pankow 4 is an electoral constituency (German: Wahlkreis) represented in the House of Representatives of Berlin. It elects one member via first-past-the-post voting.

== Geography ==
The constituency comprises the areas of Blankenburg, the north of Weißensee, and the settlement of Malchow within the borough of Pankow.

There were 29,178 eligible voters in 2026.

== Members ==
Election	Member	Party	%
2006	Christa Müller	SPD	33.9
2011	Dennis Buchner	SPD	34.5
2016	Dennis Buchner	SPD	22.4
2021	Dennis Buchner	SPD	24.1
2023	Dirk Stettner	CDU	30.2
2026	Herbert Mohr	AfD	22.9

== Election results ==
=== 2026 election ===
State election (2026): Pankow 4
Notes:	Blue background denotes the winner of the electorate vote. Pink background denotes a candidate elected from their party list. Yellow background denotes an electorate win by a list member, or other incumbent. A ✓ or ✗ denotes status of any incumbent, win or lose respectively.						
Party	Candidate	Votes	%	±%	Party votes	%	±%
AfD	Herbert Mohr	4,971	22.9	▲9.6	5,070	23.2	▲9.7
Left	Devran Bașbolat	4,627	21.3	▲7.5	5,120	23.5	▲9.2
CDU	✗ Dirk Stettner	3,753	17.3	▼12.9	3,458	15.9	▼13.0
SPD	Dennis Buchner	2,829	13.0	▼6.7	2,366	10.8	▼7.2
Greens	Friedrich Ehrhardt	2,626	12.1	▼0.6	2,380	10.9	▼1.2
BSW	Josephine Thyrêt	1,237	5.7		1,400	6.4	
Tierschutzpartei	Elke Weihusen	707	3.3	▼0.3	653	3.0	▲0.2
Volt	Friederich Helmchen	474	2.2		439	2.0	▲1.4
FDP	Pablo Puente Gamero	457	2.1	▼0.7	508	2.3	▼0.9
PARTEI					198	0.9	▼0.8
PdF					103	0.5	
ÖDP					48	0.2	▲0.1
DKP					32	0.1	▼0.1
du.					28	0.1	▼0.1
SGP					5	0.0	Steady
Informal votes		390			263		
Total valid votes		21,681			21,808		
Turnout		22,071	75.6	▲11.0			
AfD gain from CDU	Majority	344	1.6				

=== 2023 repeat election ===
Changes denoted below for the 2023 election are compared to the 2016 election, as the 2021 election was declared invalid.

State election (2023): Pankow 4
Notes:	Blue background denotes the winner of the electorate vote. Pink background denotes a candidate elected from their party list. Yellow background denotes an electorate win by a list member, or other incumbent. A ✓ or ✗ denotes status of any incumbent, win or lose respectively.						
Party	Candidate	Votes	%	±%	Party votes	%	±%
CDU	Dirk Stettner	5,505	30.2	▲11.7	5,274	28.9	▲13.4
SPD	✗ Dennis Buchner	3,607	19.8	▼2.6	3,291	18.0	▼3.0
Left	Paul Schlüter	2,530	13.9	▼7.9	2,606	14.3	▼6.6
AfD	Herbert Mohr	2,438	13.4	▼6.7	2,479	13.6	▼6.1
Greens	Ruben Joachim	2,311	12.7	▲3.4	2,215	12.1	▲3.0
Tierschutzpartei	Dietrich Alexander Rink	652	3.6		510	2.8	▲0.5
FDP	John Betzien	515	2.8	▼0.5	589	3.2	▼0.2
PARTEI	Johnny Kiele	375	2.1	▼0.6	313	1.7	▼0.2
dieBasis	Ralph Freytag	168	0.9		134	0.7	
The Grays					127	0.7	
Volt					108	0.6	
Gray Panthers					94	0.5	▼0.8
Verjüngungsforschung					73	0.4	▼0.4
Pirates					62	0.3	▼1.2
FW	Rolf Nitz	142	0.8		57	0.3	
Mieterpartei					49	0.3	
DKP					45	0.2	▼0.1
du.					39	0.2	
Klimaliste					39	0.2	
Bildet Berlin!					28	0.2	
Humanists					25	0.1	
Team Todenhöfer					25	0.1	
ÖDP					24	0.1	
NPD					18	0.1	▼0.7
Bergpartei, die ÜberPartei					15	0.1	
The Pinks/Alliance 21					12	0.1	
SGP					9	0.0	▼0.1
LKR					5	0.0	▼0.5
BüSo					5	0.0	▼0.1
Informal votes		158			150		
Total valid votes		18,243			18,270		
Turnout		18,423	64.6	▼1.1			
CDU gain from SPD	Majority	1,898	10.4				

=== 2021 election (annulled) ===
The election in 2021 was annulled and rerun in 2023.

State election (2021): Pankow 4
Notes:	Blue background denotes the winner of the electorate vote. Pink background denotes a candidate elected from their party list. Yellow background denotes an electorate win by a list member, or other incumbent. A ✓ or ✗ denotes status of any incumbent, win or lose respectively.						
Party	Candidate	Votes	%	±%	Party votes	%	±%
SPD	✓ Dennis Buchner	5,149	24.1	▲1.7	4,749	22.1	▲1.1
CDU	Dirk Stettner	3,941	18.4	Steady	3,653	17.0	▲1.5
Left	Paul Schlüter	3,400	15.9	▼5.8	3,526	16.4	▼4.4
Alliance /The Greens	Ruben Joachim	2,999	14.0	▲4.8	2,860	13.3	▲4.2
AfD	Herbert Mohr	2,589	12.1	▼8.0	2,535	11.8	▼7.9
FDP	John Betzien	1,214	5.7	▲2.3	1,320	6.1	▲2.7
Tierschutzpartei	Dietrich Alexander Rink	890	4.2		597	2.8	▲0.5
PARTEI	Johnny Kiele	505	2.4	▼0.3	386	1.8	▼0.2
dieBasis	Ralph Freytag	386	1.8		313	1.5	
The Grays					276	1.3	
FW	Rolf Nitz	335	1.6		191	0.9	
Volt					160	0.7	
APT					149	0.7	
Gray Panthers					130	0.6	▼0.7
Verjüngungsforschung					92	0.4	▼0.4
Pirates					88	0.4	▼1.1
Mieterpartei					67	0.3	
Team Todenhöfer					67	0.3	
Klimaliste					54	0.3	
DKP					40	0.2	▼0.1
ÖDP					37	0.2	
Bildet Berlin!					36	0.2	
du.					36	0.2	
NPD					36	0.2	▼0.7
Humanists					35	0.2	
The Pinks/Alliance 21					20	0.1	
LKR					19	0.1	▼0.5
Bergpartei, die ÜberPartei					12	0.1	
BüSo					8	0.0	▼0.1
SGP					5	0.0	▼0.2
Informal votes		240			189		
Total valid votes		21,408			21,497		
Turnout		21,699	75.3	▲9.6			
SPD hold	Majority	1,208	5.7				

== See also ==
- Politics of Berlin
- House of Representatives of Berlin
