= Treptow-Köpenick 7 =

State electoral district of Germany

Treptow-Köpenick 6
- Electoral district for the Berlin House of Representatives
- District: Treptow-Köpenick
- Electorate: 32,176 (2026)

Current electoral district
- Party: The Left
- Member: Hans Kromrey

Treptow-Köpenick 7 is an electoral constituency (German: Wahlkreis) represented in the House of Representatives of Berlin. It elects one member via first-past-the-post voting.

It was created for the 2026 Berlin election.

== Geography ==
There were 32,176 eligible voters in 2026.

== Members ==
Election	Member	Party	%
2026	Hans Kromrey	Left	26.7

== Election results ==
=== 2026 election ===
State election (2026): Treptow-Köpenick 7
Notes:	Blue background denotes the winner of the electorate vote. Pink background denotes a candidate elected from their party list. Yellow background denotes an electorate win by a list member, or other incumbent. A ✓ or ✗ denotes status of any incumbent, win or lose respectively.						
Party	Candidate	Votes	%	±%	Party votes	%	±%
Left	Hans Kromrey	6,736	26.7	▲8.4	6,135	24.1	▲7.6
CDU	Maik Penn	6,215	24.6	▼8.0	4,836	19.0	▼10.9
AfD	Christian Krüger	5,217	20.7	▲8.5	5,411	21.3	▲8.9
SPD	Dunja Wolff	2,827	11.2	▼5.9	2,582	10.2	▼7.9
Greens	Nikos Engel	2,024	8.0	▼4.0	2,865	11.3	▼1.2
BSW	Stefanie Warth	1,586	6.3		1,706	6.7	
FDP					496	2.0	▼1.6
APT					467	1.8	▼0.3
Volt	Julian Heyn	517	2.0		437	1.7	▲1.2
PARTEI					249	1.0	▼0.7
PdF					86	0.3	
ÖDP					56	0.2	▲0.1
DKP	Heinz Werner	111	0.4		53	0.2	▲0.1
HEIMAT					31	0.1	▲0.1
du.					18	0.1	Steady
SGP					7	0.0	
Informal votes		571			369		
Total valid votes		25,233			25,435		
Turnout		25,804	80.2	▲12.2			
Left win new seat	Majority	521	2.1				

== See also ==
- Politics of Berlin
- House of Representatives of Berlin
