= Politics of Berlin =

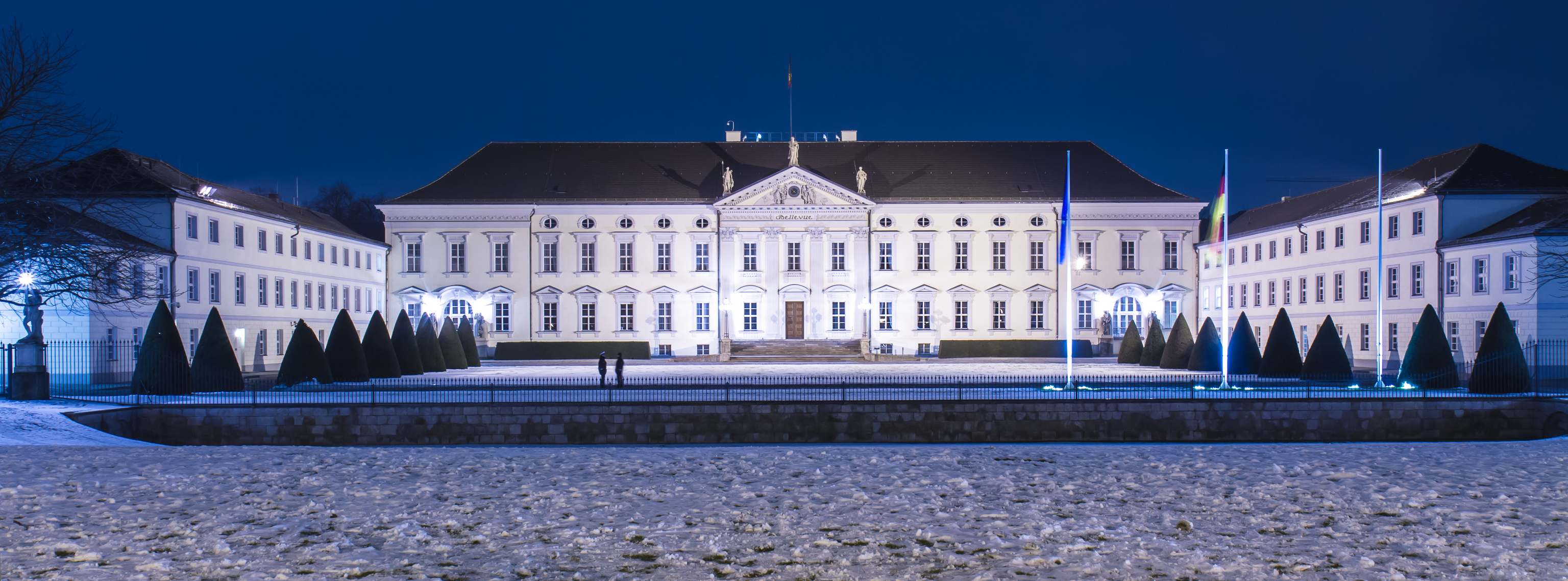
Schloss Bellevue

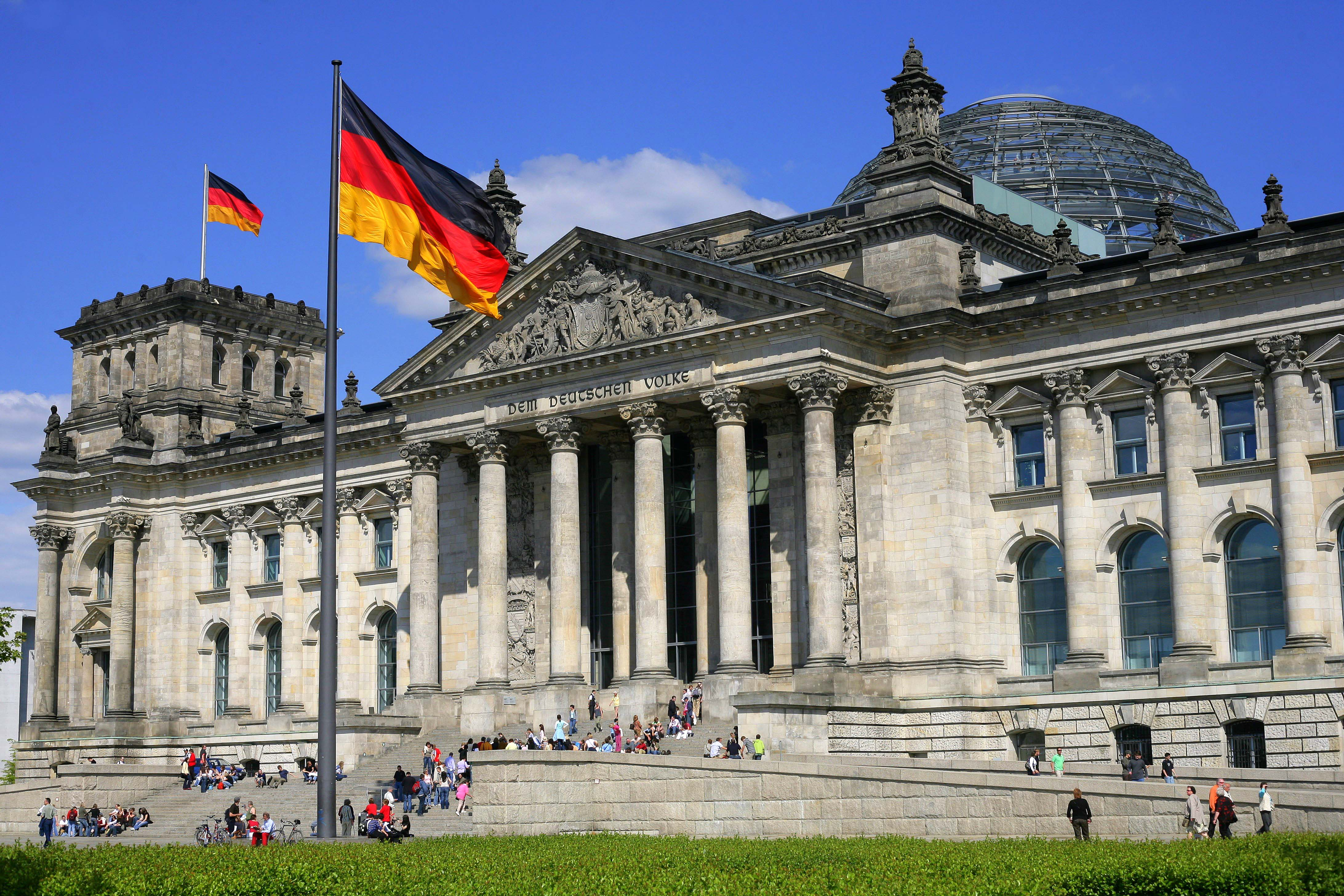
The Bundestag in Berlin

Berlin is a city-state and the capital of the Federal Republic of Germany.

== Capital city ==
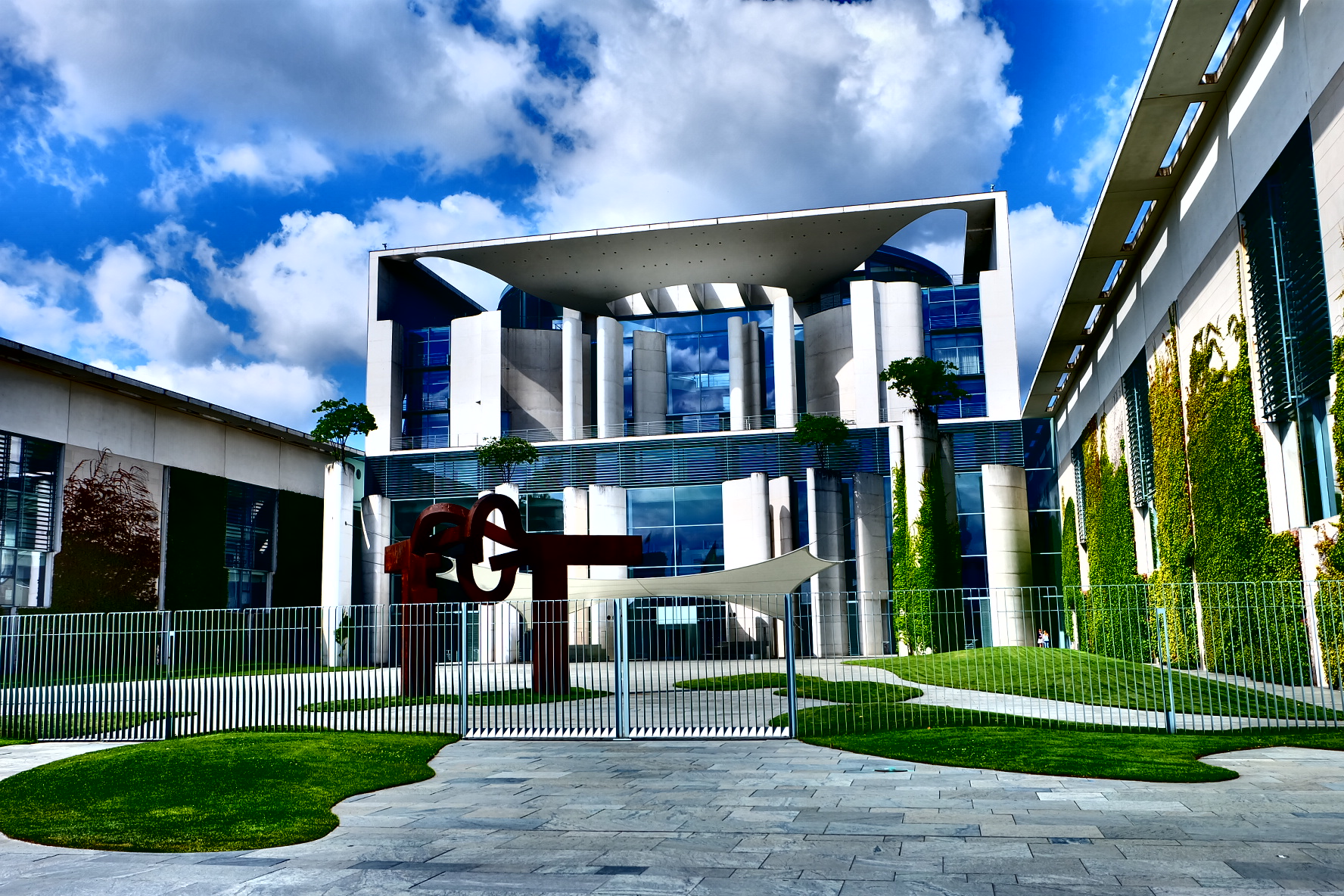
The Bundeskanzleramt

Berlin is the capital of the Federal Republic of Germany. The President of Germany, whose functions are mainly ceremonial under the German constitution, has his official residence in Schloss Bellevue. Berlin is the seat of the German executive, housed in the Chancellery, the Bundeskanzleramt.

Facing the Chancellery is the Bundestag, the German Parliament, housed in the renovated Reichstag building since the government moved back to Berlin in 1998. The Bundesrat ("federal council", functioning as an upper house) is the representation of the Federal States (Bundesländer) of Germany and has its seat at the former Prussian House of Lords.

=== Ministries ===
The relocation of the federal government and Bundestag to Berlin was completed in 1999, however with some ministries as well as some minor departments retained in the federal city Bonn, the former capital of West Germany. Discussions to move the remaining branches continue. The ministries and departments of Defence, Justice and Consumer Protection, Finance, Interior, Foreign, Economic Affairs and Energy, Labour and Social Affairs , Family Affairs, Senior Citizens, Women and Youth, Environment, Nature Conservation, Building and Nuclear Safety, Food and Agriculture, Economic Cooperation and Development, Health, Transport and Digital Infrastructure and Education and Research are based in the capital.

== City-state ==
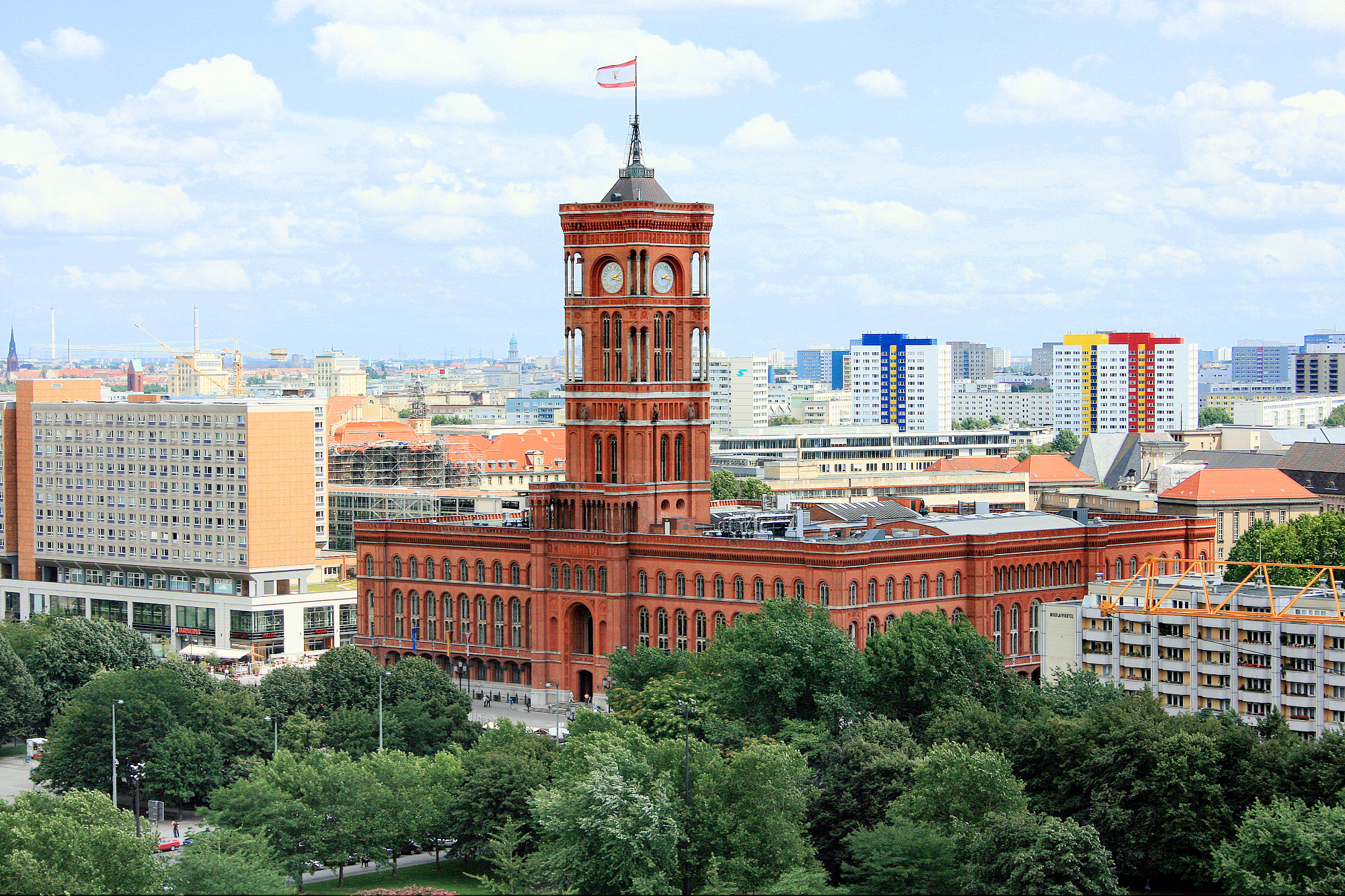
Rotes Rathaus, seat of the Berlin Senate

Since German reunification on 3 October 1990, Berlin has been one of three city-states (with Hamburg and Bremen) among Germany's 16 states. The city and state parliament is the House of Representatives, (Abgeordnetenhaus), with 141 seats. Berlin's executive body is the Senate of Berlin (Senat von Berlin). The Senate consists of the Governing Mayor (Regierender Bürgermeister) and up to eight senators with ministerial positions (one holding the official title "Mayor" (Bürgermeister) as deputy to the Governing Mayor). The Social Democratic Party (SPD) and The Left (Die Linke) took control of the city government after the 2001 state election, winning another term in the 2006 state election. The 2011 state election produced a coalition of the Social Democratic Party and the Christian Democratic Union, which was followed by a Red-Red-Green coalition of the Social Democrats, Greens, and Left Party after the 2016 state election and 2021 state election. The current government consists of a coalition between the Christian Democrats and Social Democrats after the 2023 state election.

The Governing Mayor is Lord Mayor of the city (Oberbürgermeister der Stadt) and Prime Minister of the federal state (Ministerpräsident des Bundeslandes). The office of Berlin's Governing Mayor is in the Rotes Rathaus (Red City Hall). From 2001 to 2014, this office was held by Klaus Wowereit of the SPD. Between 2014 and 2021 the position was held by Michael Müller, who was succeeded by Franziska Giffey. Both politicians are also of the SPD. In April 2023, Berlin got its first conservative mayor, Kai Wegner of CDU, in more than two decades.

The total annual state budget of Berlin in 2007 exceeded €20.5 ($28.7) billion, which included a budget surplus of €80 ($112) million (the first surplus in the city-state's history). Due to increasing growth rates and tax revenues, the Senate of Berlin calculated an increasing budget surplus for 2008. The total budget was an estimated amount €5.5 ($7.7) billion, financed by the German government or the German Bundesländer. Primarily due to reunification-related expenditures, Berlin as a German state accumulated more debt than any other city in Germany (an estimated €60 ($84) billion in December 2007).

The city has ten state-level ministries (Senatsverwaltungen, Senate Departments), each led by a Senator, plus the Senate Chancellery, which is the office of the Governing Mayor. It also has seven state-level agencies (Landesämter), such as the Berlin Immigration Office.

=== Boroughs ===
Map of Berlin's twelve boroughs

Berlin is divided into twelve boroughs (Bezirke), reduced from 23 boroughs before Berlin's 2001 administrative reform. Each borough has a number of localities (Ortsteile), which often have historic roots in older municipalities predating the formation of Greater Berlin on 1 October 1920 and were urbanised and incorporated into the city. Many residents strongly identify with their localities (or boroughs). Berlin has 96 localities, commonly made up of several city neighbourhoods (known as Kiez in the Berlin dialect).

Each borough is governed by a council (Bezirksamt) with five councillors (Bezirksstadträte) and a borough mayor (Bezirksbürgermeister). The borough council is elected by the borough assembly (Bezirksverordnetenversammlung). The boroughs of Berlin are not independent municipalities; the borough governments' power is limited, and subordinate to the Berlin Senate. The borough mayors form a council of mayors (Rat der Bürgermeister, led by the city's governing mayor), which advises the Senate. The localities have no local government bodies, and the administrative duties of the former locality representative (the Ortsvorsteher) were assumed by the borough mayors.

=== Sister cities ===
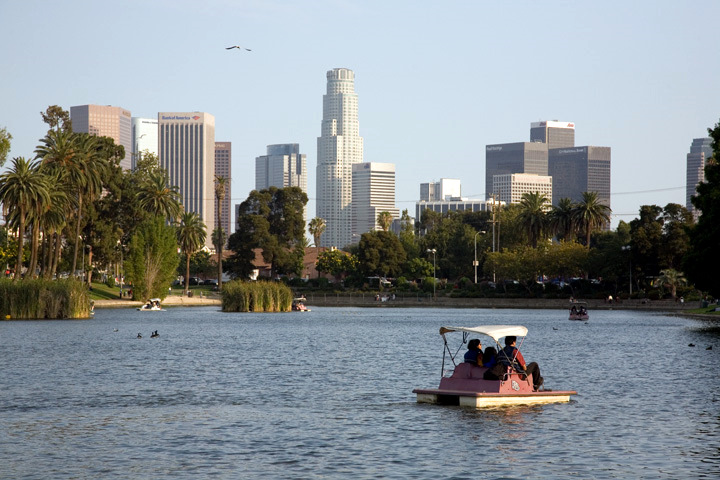
Los Angeles became the first sister city to Berlin in 1967.

Berlin maintains official partnerships with 17 cities. Town twinning between Berlin and other cities began with Los Angeles in 1967. East Berlin's partnerships were cancelled at German reunification, but later partially reestablished. West Berlin's partnerships were limited to the borough level. During the Cold War the partnerships reflected spheres of influence, with West Berlin partnering with Western capitals and East Berlin partnering primarily with cities of the Warsaw Pact and its allies.

There are joint projects with a number of other cities, such as Belgrade, Copenhagen, Helsinki, Johannesburg, Shanghai, Seoul, Sofia, Sydney and Vienna. Berlin participates in international city associations such as the Union of the Capitals of the European Union, Eurocities, Network of European Cities of Culture, Metropolis, Summit Conference of the World's Major Cities, Conference of the World's Capital Cities. Its partner cities are:

- 1967 Los Angeles, United States
- 1987 Paris, France
- 1988 Madrid, Spain
- 1989 Vienna, Austria
- 1989 Istanbul, Turkey
- 1991 Warsaw, Poland
- 1991 Moscow, Russia
- 1991 Budapest, Hungary
- 1992 Brussels, Belgium
- 1993 Jakarta, Indonesia
- 1993 Tashkent, Uzbekistan
- 1993 Mexico City, Mexico
- 1993 Bern, Switzerland
- 1994 Beijing, China
- 1994 Tokyo, Japan
- 1994 Buenos Aires, Argentina
- 1995 Prague, Czech Republic
- 2000 Vaduz, Liechtenstein
- 2000 Windhoek, Namibia
- 2000 London, United Kingdom

== House of Representatives ==
The House of Representatives is Berlin's state parliament (Landtag) and is elected every five years.

=== Party strength in the legislature ===
A darkened box under a party in any given year denotes that the party had either not yet been founded, or the party had become defunct, by the date of that election.

Pre-1990 in West Berlin

Election year	Total seats	Seats won				
Election year	Total seats	SPD	CDU	FDP	Grüne	Other
1948	98	60	21	17		
1950	127	61	34	32		
1954	127	64	44	19		
1958	133	78	55			
1963	140	89	41	10		
1967	137	81	47	9		
1971	138	73	54	11		
1975	147	67	69	11		
1979	135	61	63	11		
1981	132	51	65	7	9	
1985	144	48	69	12	15	
1989	138	55	55		17	11 (Note: The Republicans)

1990-, Post-reunification

Election year	Total seats	Seats won							
Election year	Total seats	SPD	CDU	Grüne	PDS	FDP	Linke	AfD	Other
1990	241	76	101	23 (Note: 12 won by Green Party (West), and 11 won by Alliance 90 (East))	23	18			
1995	206	55	87	30	34				
1999	169	42	76	18	33				
2001	141	44	35	14	33	15			
2006	149	53	37	23	23	13			
2011	152	48	39	30			20		15 (Note: Pirates)
2016	160	38	31	27		12	27	25	
2021	147	36	30	32		12	24	13	
2023	159	34	52	34			22	17	
2026	130	18	28	22			38	24	

=== Legislative compositions ===
West Berlin Council, following 1948 election

1st Abgeordnetenhaus, following 1950 election

2nd Abgeordnetenhaus, following 1954 election

3rd Abgeordnetenhaus, following 1958 election

4th Abgeordnetenhaus, following 1963 election

5th Abgeordnetenhaus, following 1967 election

6th Abgeordnetenhaus, following 1971 election

7th Abgeordnetenhaus, following 1975 election

8th Abgeordnetenhaus, following 1979 election

9th Abgeordnetenhaus, following 1981 election

10th Abgeordnetenhaus, following 1985 election

11th Abgeordnetenhaus, following 1989 election

12th Abgeordnetenhaus, following 1990 election

13th Abgeordnetenhaus, following 1995 election

14th Abgeordnetenhaus, following 1999 election

15th Abgeordnetenhaus, following 2001 election

16th Abgeordnetenhaus, following 2006 election

17th Abgeordnetenhaus, following 2011 election

18th Abgeordnetenhaus, following 2016 election

19th Abgeordnetenhaus (Annulled), following 2021 election

19th Abgeordnetenhaus, following 2023 election

20th Abgeordnetenhaus, following 2026 election

=== City-state election results maps ===
People who live in the former West Berlin tend to vote for the CDU and the SPD, While voters in the former East Berlin tend to vote for Linke and the AfD.

12th Abgeordnetenhaus, following 1990 election

13th Abgeordnetenhaus, following 1995 election

14th Abgeordnetenhaus, following 1999 election

15th Abgeordnetenhaus, following 2001 election

16th Abgeordnetenhaus, following 2006 election

17th Abgeordnetenhaus, following 2011 election

18th Abgeordnetenhaus, following 2016 election

19th Abgeordnetenhaus (annulled), following 2021 election

19th Abgeordnetenhaus, following 2023 election

20th Abgeordnetenhaus, following 2026 election

=== Constituencies in the legislature ===
- Mitte 1
- Mitte 2
- Mitte 3
- Mitte 4
- Mitte 5
- Mitte 6
- Mitte 7
- Friedrichshain-Kreuzberg 1
- Friedrichshain-Kreuzberg 2
- Friedrichshain-Kreuzberg 3
- Friedrichshain-Kreuzberg 4
- Friedrichshain-Kreuzberg 5
- Friedrichshain-Kreuzberg 6
- Pankow 1
- Pankow 2
- Pankow 3
- Pankow 4
- Pankow 5
- Pankow 6
- Pankow 7
- Pankow 8
- Pankow 9
- Charlottenburg-Wilmersdorf 1
- Charlottenburg-Wilmersdorf 2
- Charlottenburg-Wilmersdorf 3
- Charlottenburg-Wilmersdorf 4
- Charlottenburg-Wilmersdorf 5
- Charlottenburg-Wilmersdorf 6
- Charlottenburg-Wilmersdorf 7
- Spandau 1
- Spandau 2
- Spandau 3
- Spandau 4
- Spandau 5
- Steglitz-Zehlendorf 1
- Steglitz-Zehlendorf 2
- Steglitz-Zehlendorf 3
- Steglitz-Zehlendorf 4
- Steglitz-Zehlendorf 5
- Steglitz-Zehlendorf 6
- Steglitz-Zehlendorf 7
- Tempelhof-Schöneberg 1
- Tempelhof-Schöneberg 2
- Tempelhof-Schöneberg 3
- Tempelhof-Schöneberg 4
- Tempelhof-Schöneberg 5
- Tempelhof-Schöneberg 6
- Tempelhof-Schöneberg 7
- Neukölln 1
- Neukölln 2
- Neukölln 3
- Neukölln 4
- Neukölln 5
- Neukölln 6
- Treptow-Köpenick 1
- Treptow-Köpenick 2
- Treptow-Köpenick 3
- Treptow-Köpenick 4
- Treptow-Köpenick 5
- Treptow-Köpenick 6
- Treptow-Köpenick 7
- Marzahn-Hellersdorf 1
- Marzahn-Hellersdorf 2
- Marzahn-Hellersdorf 3
- Marzahn-Hellersdorf 4
- Marzahn-Hellersdorf 5
- Marzahn-Hellersdorf 6
- Lichtenberg 1
- Lichtenberg 2
- Lichtenberg 3
- Lichtenberg 4
- Lichtenberg 5
- Lichtenberg 6
- Reinickendorf 1
- Reinickendorf 2
- Reinickendorf 3
- Reinickendorf 4
- Reinickendorf 5
- Reinickendorf 6

== List of Bundestag constituencies ==
No	Constituency	Member	2025	Voters	2021	2017	2013	2009	2005	2002	1998	1994	1990
74	Berlin-Mitte	Hanna Steinmüller	Grüne	207,445	Grüne	SPD	SPD	SPD	SPD	SPD	Created for 2002 election		
75	Berlin-Pankow	Julia Schneider	Grüne	235,392	Grüne	Left	Left	Left	SPD	SPD	Created for 2002 election		
76	Berlin-Reinickendorf	Marvin Schulz	CDU	172,428	CDU	CDU	CDU	CDU	SPD	SPD	SPD	CDU	CDU
77	Berlin-Spandau – Charlottenburg North	Helmut Kleebank	SPD	176,536	SPD	SPD	CDU	CDU	SPD	SPD	SPD	CDU	CDU
78	Berlin-Steglitz-Zehlendorf	Adrian Grasse	CDU	214,757	CDU	CDU	CDU	CDU	CDU	SPD	SPD	CDU	CDU
79	Berlin-Charlottenburg-Wilmersdorf	Lukas Krieger	CDU	195,504	SPD	CDU	CDU	SPD	SPD	SPD	SPD	CDU	CDU
80	Berlin-Tempelhof-Schöneberg	Moritz Heuberger	Grüne	229,238	SPD	CDU	CDU	CDU	SPD	SPD	Created for 2002 election		
81	Berlin-Neukölln	Ferat Koçak	Left	192,506	SPD	SPD	SPD	CDU	SPD	SPD	SPD	CDU	CDU
82	Berlin-Friedrichshain-Kreuzberg – Prenzlauer Berg East	Pascal Meiser	Left	218,729	Grüne	Grüne	Grüne	Grüne	Grüne	Grüne	Created for 2002 election		
83	Berlin-Treptow - Köpenick	Gregor Gysi	Left	206,841	Left	Left	Left	Left	Left	SPD	SPD	SPD	
84	Berlin-Marzahn - Hellersdorf	Gottfried Curio	AfD	195,867	CDU	Left	Left	Left	Left	PDS	PDS	PDS	PDS
85	Berlin-Lichtenberg	Ines Schwerdtner	Left	196,799	Left	Left	Left	Left	Left	PDS	PDS	PDS	

== Security ==
=== Berlin Police ===
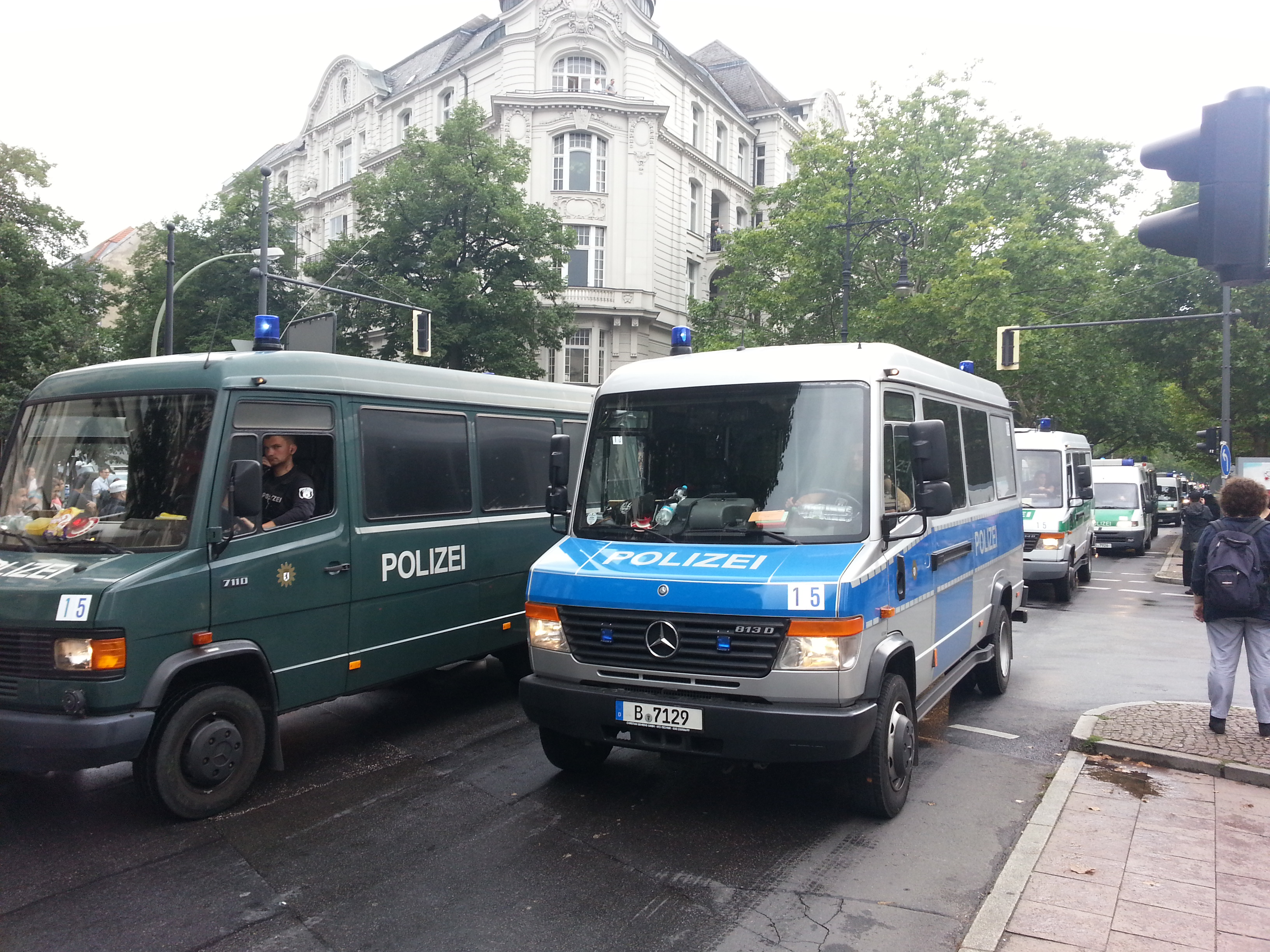
A police bus in blue-silver livery

The Berlin Police (Der Polizeipräsident in Berlin' - The Police Chief of Berlin), or commonly Berliner Polizei is the German Landespolizei force for the city-state of Berlin. Law enforcement in Germany is divided between federal and state (Land) agencies. Berlin Police is divided into 6 local directorates (Direktion). Each local directorate is responsible for one to three Berliner districts:

- Direktion 1: Reinickendorf, Pankow
- Direktion 2: Spandau, Charlottenburg-Wilmersdorf
- Direktion 3: Mitte
- Direktion 4: Tempelhof-Schöneberg, Steglitz-Zehlendorf
- Direktion 5: Friedrichshain-Kreuzberg, Neukölln
- Direktion 6: Marzahn-Hellersdorf, Treptow-Köpenick, Lichtenberg

=== Federal Police ===
The Federal Police (Bundespolizei or BPOL) is a (primarily) uniformed federal police force in Berlin and Germany. It is subordinate to the Federal Ministry of the Interior (Bundesministerium des Innern (BMI)).

The Bundespolizei can also be used to reinforce state police if requested by a state (Land) government. The BPOL maintains these reserve forces to deal with major demonstrations, disturbances or emergencies, supplementing the capabilities of the State Operational Support Units. Several highly trained detachments are available for crisis situations requiring armored cars, water cannon or other special equipment.

BPOL has investigators conduct criminal investigations only within its jurisdiction; otherwise the cases are referred to the appropriate state police force or to the federal criminal investigative agency, the Federal Criminal Police (Bundeskriminalamt, BKA). In addition, the Bundespolizei cooperates closely with German state executive authorities, such as prosecutor's offices (Staatsanwaltschaft) in pursuing criminal investigations.

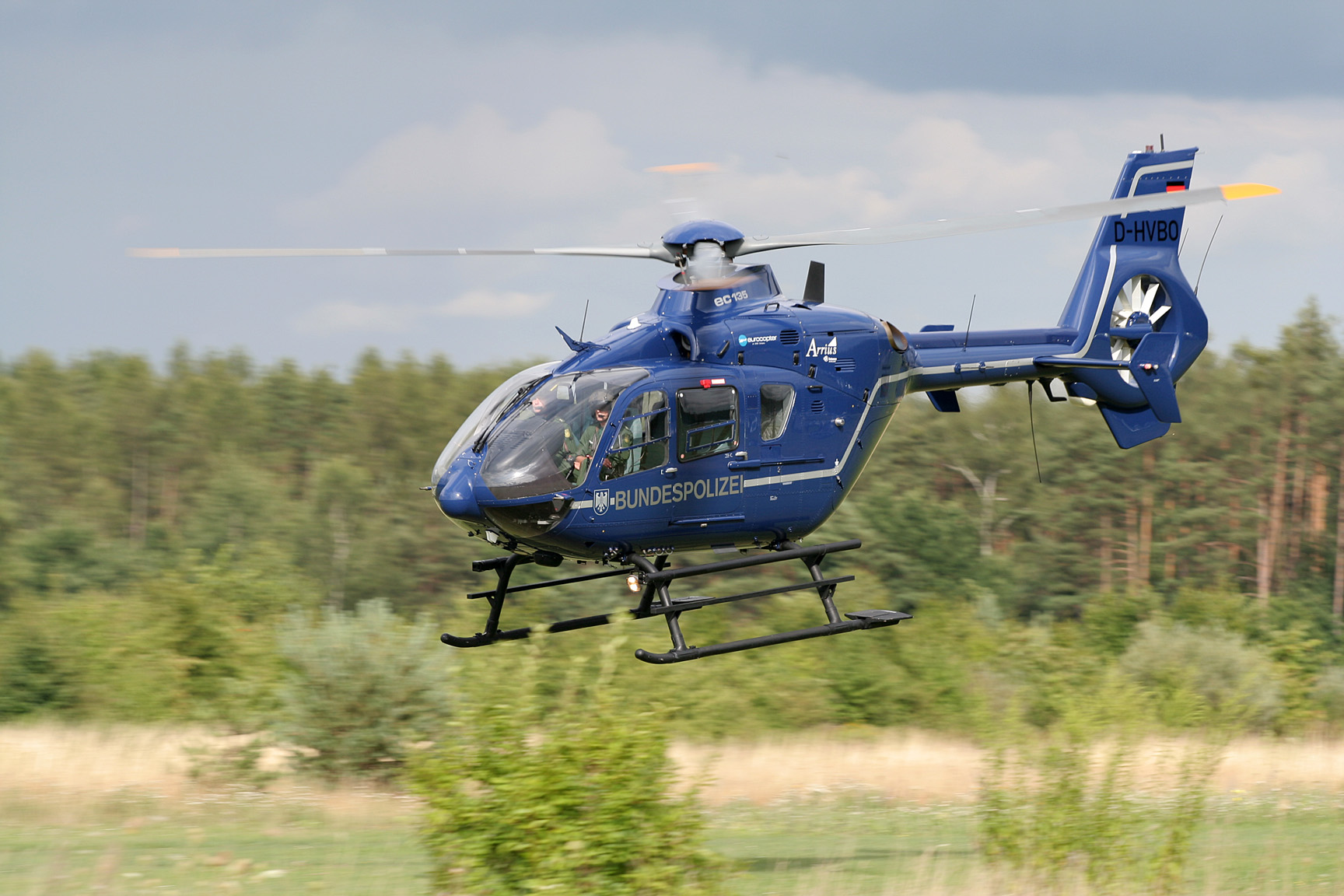
A Eurocopter EC-135 of the Bundespolizei

The Bundespolizei has the following missions:

- Border security (Grenzpolizei or Grepo), to include passport control
- Protection of federal buildings such as Schloss Bellevue, the residence of the German Bundespräsident.
- Providing the federal government's mobile response force for internal security events.
- Providing transportation security at international airports and on the German railways.
- Providing counter-terrorism forces (GSG 9).
- Providing air (or sky) marshals.
- Supporting international police missions for the United Nations and the EU
- Providing in-house security for some German embassies.
- Providing rescue helicopter service.

== See also ==
- List of people from Berlin
- Politics of Germany
- European Union
