= Lichtenberg 3 =

State electoral district of Germany

- Electoral district for the Berlin House of Representatives
- Lichtenberg 3 in 2026
- District: Lichtenberg
- Electorate: 33,724 (2026)

Current electoral district
- Party: The Left
- Member: Claudia Engelmann

Lichtenberg 3 is an electoral constituency (German: Wahlkreis) represented in the House of Representatives of Berlin. It elects one member via first-past-the-post voting.

== Geography ==
The constituency comprises the areas of Alt-Hohenschönhausen south of Konrad-Wolf-Straße, Sandinostraße, Landsberger Allee, Fennpfuhl, Evangelisches Krankenhaus Herzberge, Rosenfelder Ring, and Genisnger Straße. It is entirely within the borough of Lichtenberg.

There were 33,724 eligible voters in 2026.

== Members ==
Election	Member	Party	%
2006	Marion Platta	The Left	40.8
2011	Marion Platta	The Left	36.0
2016	Marion Platta	The Left	30.4
2021	Claudia Engelmann	The Left	24.5
2023	Dennis Hausstein	CDU	23.4
2026	Claudia Engelmann	Left	32.9

== Election results ==
=== 2026 election ===
State election (2026): Lichtenberg 3
Notes:	Blue background denotes the winner of the electorate vote. Pink background denotes a candidate elected from their party list. Yellow background denotes an electorate win by a list member, or other incumbent. A ✓ or ✗ denotes status of any incumbent, win or lose respectively.						
Party	Candidate	Votes	%	±%	Party votes	%	±%
Left	Claudia Engelmann	7,305	32.9	▲9.5	6,747	30.0	▲10.5
AfD	Florian Beckert	5,590	25.2	▲10.5	5,725	25.4	▲10.9
CDU	✗ Dennis Haustein	3,694	16.6	▼6.8	2,820	12.5	▼10.6
SPD	Marie Scharfenberg	1,932	8.7	▼10.3	2,089	9.3	▼9.2
BSW	Sarah Klipphahn	1,545	7.0		1,633	7.3	
Greens	Evan Vosberg	1,276	5.7	▼3.1	1,531	6.8	▼2.2
APT					688	3.1	▼0.5
Volt	Mario Marinoff	518	2.3		404	1.8	▲1.0
FDP	Philip Schmidt	361	1.6	▼1.6	400	1.8	▼1.3
PARTEI					207	0.9	▼1.0
PdF					123	0.5	
HEIMAT					56	0.2	Steady
DKP					39	0.2	▼0.2
ÖDP					28	0.1	Steady
du.					19	0.1	▼0.2
SGP					7	0.0	▼0.1
Informal votes		659			364		
Total valid votes		22,221			22,516		
Turnout		22,880	67.8	▲13.5			
Left gain from CDU	Majority	1,715	7.7				

=== 2023 repeat election ===
Changes denoted below for the 2023 election are compared to the 2016 election, as the 2021 election was declared invalid.

State election (2023): Lichtenberg 3
Notes:	Blue background denotes the winner of the electorate vote. Pink background denotes a candidate elected from their party list. Yellow background denotes an electorate win by a list member, or other incumbent. A ✓ or ✗ denotes status of any incumbent, win or lose respectively.						
Party	Candidate	Votes	%	±%	Party votes	%	±%
CDU	Dennis Haustein	4,254	23.4	▲11.4	4,200	23.1	▲11.7
Left	Claudia Engelmann	4,244	23.4	▼7.0	3,539	19.5	▼8.1
SPD	Karsten Strein	3,442	19.0	▼3.6	3,361	18.5	▼2.4
AfD	Marianne Kleinert	2,661	14.7	▼6.7	2,646	14.6	▼6.3
Greens	Jette Nietzard	1,606	8.9	▲3.1	1,642	9.0	▲3.7
APT	Jana Schnell	1,606	8.9	▲3.1	1,642	9.0	▲3.7
FDP	Christian Wolf	586	3.2	▲0.5	560	3.1	▲0.4
PARTEI					349	1.9	Steady
Volt					147	0.8	
Gray Panthers					121	0.7	▼0.7
The Grays					100	0.6	
FW	Jana Halbreiter	258	1.4		99	0.5	
Pirates					94	0.5	▼1.0
Verjüngungsforschung					92	0.5	▼0.3
dieBasis	Hans-Jürgen Thiel	150	0.8		79	0.4	
Mieterpartei					74	0.4	
DKP					65	0.4	▼0.1
Humanists					58	0.3	
Team Todenhöfer					47	0.3	
du.					46	0.3	
NPD					37	0.2	▼0.8
Klimaliste					34	0.2	
Bildet Berlin!					32	0.2	
Bergpartei, die ÜberPartei					21	0.1	
ÖDP					20	0.1	
BüSo					18	0.1	Steady
SGP					16	0.1	▼0.1
The Pinks/Alliance 21					15	0.1	
LKR	Matthias Bruse	22	0.1		8	0.0	▼0.5
Informal votes		192			167		
Total valid votes		18,144			18,173		
Turnout		18,352	54.4	▼4.9			
CDU gain from Left	Majority	10	0.0				

== See also ==
- Politics of Berlin
- House of Representatives of Berlin
