= Bildet Berlin! =

Educate Berlin! Bildet Berlin!
- Leader: Florian Bublys; Tamara Adamzik
- Founded: April 10, 2021; 4 years ago
- Membership (2021): ca. 50
- Ideology: Education reform
- Political position: Single-issue
- Colors: Yellow

Website
- https://bildet-berlin.de/

Educate Berlin! (German: Bildet Berlin! e.V.), is a minor single-issue political party in Germany that focuses on education reform in the city-state of Berlin.

== History ==
The party was founded in April 2021 as successor of the registered association Bildet Berlin! Initiative für Schulqualität (English: Educate Berlin! Initiative for School quality) founded ten years prior in 2011.

As of May 2021, it had approximately 50 members.

== Program ==
The party believes that the education system has been neglected and needs to be reformed through the betterment of working conditions in schools and kindergartens. It wishes, among other things, to reduce the size of school classes and kindergarten groups, paying higher salaries, reducing working hours, and reducing non-schooling related administrative tasks. It wishes to staff every educational institution at 110% to prevent a shortage of teaching staff. The party additionally wants to insure that educational institutions are clean and well digitally equipped.

== Election results ==
Educate Berlin! partook in the 2021 Berlin state election and the repeat election in 2023. It only participated with a party-list.

Year	BE	
Year	Votes	%
2021	2,486	0.1
2023	1,790	0.1
