= Franziska (given name) =

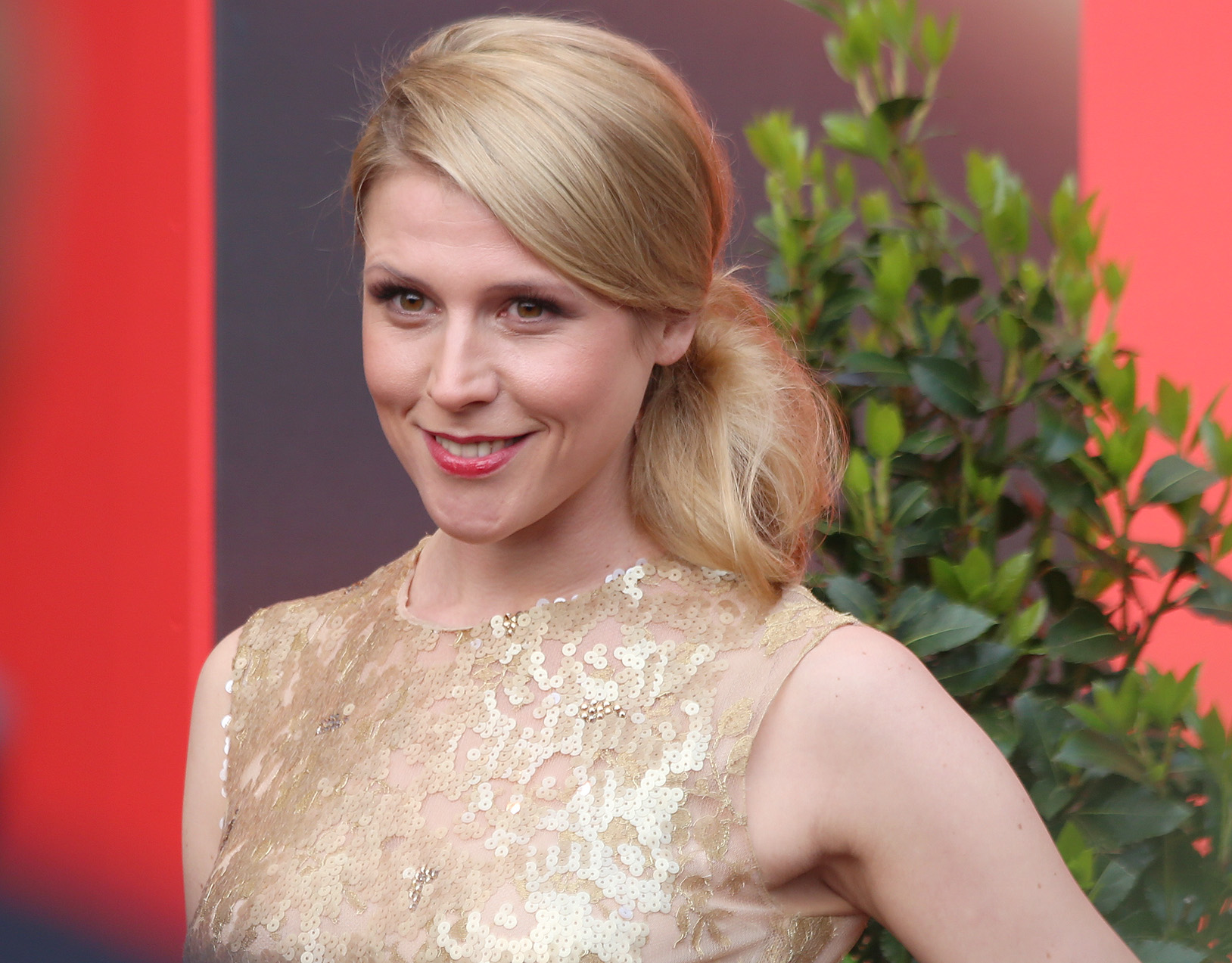
Franziska Weisz

Franziska is a given name. Notable people with the name include:

- Franziska Albl (born 1995), German ice hockey player
- Franziska Baumann (born 1965), Swiss musician and composer
- Franziska Becskehazy (born 1966), Brazilian cross-country skier
- Franziska Bertels (born 1986), German bobsledder
- Franziska Boas (1902–1988), American dancer
- Franziska Brantner (born 1979), German politician
- Franziska Brauße (born 1998), German racing cyclist
- Franziska Brychcy (born 1984), German politician
- Franziska Buch (born 1960), German film director and screenwriter
- Franziska Busch (born 1985), German ice hockey forward
- Franziska Cornet (1808–1870), German opera singer
- Franziska Donner (1900–1992), inaugural First Lady of South Korea
- Franziska Drohsel (born 1980), German politician
- Franziska Ehmcke (born 1947), professor
- Franziska Ellmenreich (1847–1931), German stage actress
- Franziska Emmerling (born 1975), German chemist
- Franziska Feilbogen (1873-1927), Austrian literary scholar, translator, writer and feminist
- Franziska Fischer (born 1968), German journalist, TV presenter, and author
- Franziska Fritz (born 1991), German bobsledder
- Franziska Giffey (born 1978), German politician
- Franziska Gminder (born 1945), German politician
- Franziska Goltz (born 1985), German sports sailor
- Franziska Gottwald, German mezzo-soprano singer
- Franziska Grieder, Swiss-American veterinary scientist
- Franziska Gritsch (born 1997), Austrian World Cup alpine ski racer
- Franziska Gude (born 1976), field hockey midfielder
- Franziska Heinz (born 1972), East German and German female handball player
- Franziska Hennes (born 1992), professional squash player
- Franziska Hentke (born 1989), German butterfly swimmer
- Franziska Hentschel (born 1970), former field hockey forward from Germany
- Franziska Hildebrand (born 1987), German biathlete
- Franziska Hofmann (born 1994), German athlete
- Franziska Huhn (born 1977), German harpist
- Franziska Huth (born 1987), German singer of Eyes of Eden
- Franziska Jöhr, former Swiss curler
- Franziska Kaufmann (born 1987), Swiss curler
- Franziska Kessel (1906–1934), German politician
- Franziska Kinz (1897–1980), Austrian film actress
- Franziska Knuppe (born 1974), German model
- Franziska Koch (cyclist) (born 2000), German cyclist
- Franziska Konitz (born 1986), German judoka
- Franziska Liebhardt (born 1982), Paralympic athlete from Germany
- Franziska Liebing (1899–1993), German actress
- Franziska Maichle (born 1992), German singer
- Franziska Mally (born 1916), Austrian swimmer
- Franziska Martienssen-Lohmann (1887–1971), German soprano
- Franziska Meissner-Diemer, German columnist.
- Franziska Mietzner (born 1988), German handballer
- Franziska Möllinger (1817–1880), German-born Swiss photographer
- Franziska Müller (born 1990), German handballer
- Franziska Müller-Rech (born 1985), German politician
- Franziska Oehme (born 1944), German actress
- Franziska Peer (born 1987), Austrian sport shooter
- Franziska Petri (born 1973), German actress
- Franziska Pigulla (1964–2019), German actress, news presenter, and voice actress
- Franziska Preuß (born 1994), German biathlete
- Franziska Reindl (born 1982), German ice hockey player
- Franziska Rochat-Moser (1966–2002), long-distance runner from Switzerland
- Franziska Romana Koch (1748–1796), German ballet dancer, soprano, and actress
- Franziska Scanagatta (1776–1865), Italian woman who disguised herself as a man in order to attend an Austrian officer school
- Franziska Schenk (born 1974), former German speed skater
- Franziska Schlopsnies (1884–1944), German fashion, poster, and graphic designer
- Franziska Schreiber (born 1990), German politician
- Franziska Sontag (1788–1865), German operatic soprano and theater's actress
- Franziska Stading (1763–1836), Swedish opera singer
- Franziska Stark (born 1961), German pool player
- Franziska Steffen (born 1989), Indonesian-born Swiss freestyle skier
- Franziska Szegöffy (1816–1882), stage actor
- Franziska Tausig (1890s–1989), Austrian author
- Franziska Tiburtius (1843–1927), German doctor
- Franziska Traub (born 1962), German actress
- Franziska Troegner (born 1954), German actress
- Franziska van Almsick (born 1978), German swimmer
- Franziska Volkmann (born 1994), German female badminton player
- Franziska von Corvin-Krasinsk, Polish noblewoman
- Franziska von Hohenheim (1748–1811), German noblewoman
- Franziska von Känel, a former Swiss curler
- Franziska von Reitzenstein (1834–1896), German novelist
- Franziska Walser (born 1950), German actress
- Franziska Weber (born 1989), German sprint canoer
- Franziska Weisz (born 1980), Austrian actress
- Franziska zu Königsegg-Aulendorf (1797–1872), German noblewoman

== Fictional characters ==
- Franziska von Karma, a character in the Ace Attorney series

== See also ==
- Franziska (disambiguation)
- Fränzi
