= Emmerling =

Emmerling is a German surname. Notable people with the surname include:

- Adolph Emmerling (1842–1906), German chemist
- Björn Emmerling (born 1975), German field hockey player
- Franziska Emmerling (born 1975), German chemist
- Stefan Emmerling (born 1966), German footballer and manager
