= Huhn =

Huhn is the German word for chicken. It's also a German surname. Notable people with the surname include:

- Bruno Siegfried Huhn
- Charlie Huhn
- Clara Huhn (1887–2000), American supercentenarian
- Emil Huhn
- Franziska Huhn (born 1970), German harpist
- Wolfram Huhn

== See also ==
- Hahn (disambiguation)
- Haan
- Hehn
