= Maximilian Schirmer =

German politician

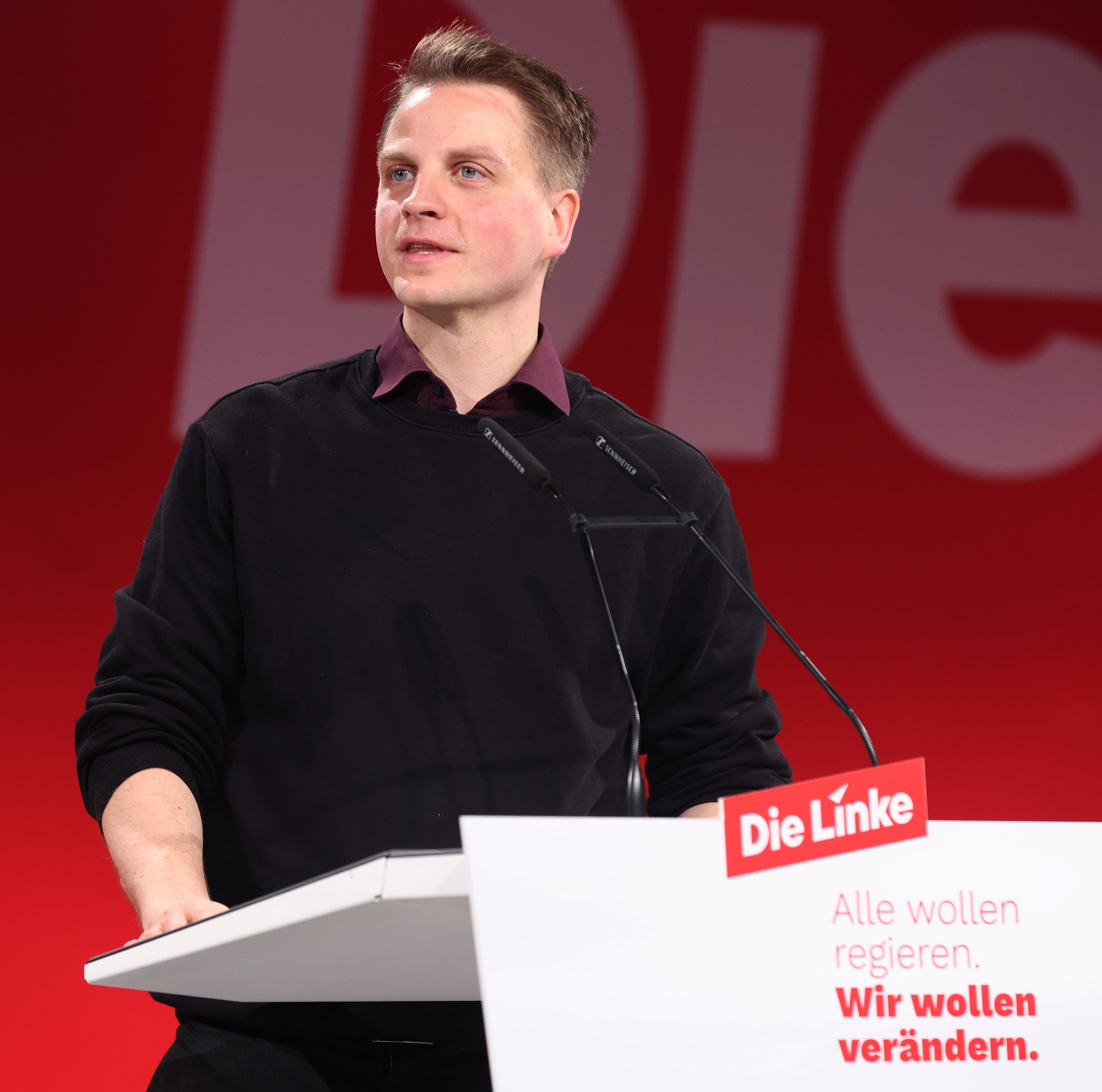
- Schirmer in 2025

Co-leader of Die Linke Berlin
- Incumbent
- Assumed office 2023

Personal details
- Born: 7 August 1990 (age 36) Berlin, Germany
- Party: Die Linke

Maximilian Schirmer (born 7 August 1990) is a German politician from Die Linke. He has been co-chairman of Die Linke Berlin since 2023 and deputy federal chairman of The Left Party since October 2024.

== Biography ==
Schirmer grew up in Berlin in the quarters of Pankow and Weißensee, where he attended primary and secondary school. He performed his civilian service at the Königstadt youth center. He studied politics, administration, and public law, earning a bachelor's degree in 2016 and a master's degree in political science in 2020.

He worked as a health officer in the Lichtenberg district office.

== Political career ==
Schirmer joined The Left Party in 2013. He became a member of the Pankow District Assembly in 2016. When the party's state list for the 2016 Berlin state election was drawn up, Schirmer was only placed 36th and was not elected to the Berlin House of Representatives. In 2022, he became one of the two co-chairs of the district assembly group.

In the 2021 Berlin state election and the 2023 repeat election, he ran in 36th and 37th place, respectively, on the Left Party's state list; in 2023 he also ran in the Treptow-Köpenick 5 constituency. He failed to win a seat in the Berlin House of Representatives in both elections.

On 13 May 2023, he was elected co-chair of the Left Party in Berlin alongside Franziska Brychcy; since May 2025, he has held this office alongside Kerstin Wolter. The Left Party's congress in Halle elected Schirmer as deputy chair of the federal party in October 2024.

On 14 December 2024, Schirmer was nominated by The Left as a candidate for the direct mandate in the Berlin-Pankow constituency for the 2025 German federal election, but as the runner-up with 22.9%, he received around 5000 fewer votes than the Alliance 90/The Greens candidate Julia Schneider.
