= Ehmcke =

Ehmcke is a surname. Notable people with the surname include:

- Franziska Ehmcke (born 1947), German professor of Japanese Studies
- Fritz Helmuth Ehmcke (1878–1965), German graphic designer, typographer, and illustrator
- Jaana Ehmcke (born 1987), German swimmer
