= Franziska =

Franziska may refer to:

== People ==
- Franziska (given name)
- Patrick Franziska (born 1992), German table tennis player

=== Characters ===
- Franziska von Karma, character in the Ace Attorney series

== Other uses ==
- Franziska (play), a 1912 play by the German dramatist Frank Wedekind
- Franziska Tesaurus, a Gepid royal tomb found in Romania
- 520 Franziska, an Eoan asteroid from the outer regions of the asteroid belt
- Franziska, an Italian ska band

== See also ==
- Francis (given name)
- Fränzi
- Franziska Linkerhand, a 1974 novel by Brigitte Reimann
- MS Franziska, a German television series
