= Franziska Feilbogen =

Franziska Feilbogen, née Rindskopf, also Franza Feilbogen (19 October 1873 – 9 October 1927), was an Austrian literary scholar, translator, writer and feminist.

== Life ==
She was born in Vienna on 19 October 1873 as the daughter of Julius Rindskopf (1827–1901), co-owner of a company, and Charlotte Schoendel Rindskopf (née Arnstein, 1835–1902). She had five brothers and two sisters. Several of her siblings later took the name Rink.

Franziska Rink married the lawyer and national economist, writer and translator Siegmund Feilbogen, son of Rabbi Benjamin Feilbogen, on 23 June 1901 in Linz according to the Jewish rite. After his emigration to Switzerland, she studied at the University of Zurich and was awarded her doctorate in 1916 with a dissertation on Friedrich Theodor Vischer – this dissertation was reviewed in several literary journals after its publication. She worked as a writer and translator. In 1918, she again published articles in Artistic Institute O. Füssli. In 1919, she wrote a review of Hans Blüher's The Role of Eroticism in Male Society for the newly founded feminist journal Die Frau im Staat. In 1925, she wrote an article for Helene Stöckers Mutterschutz-Organ Die Neue Generation. Of particular importance were her translations of Marie Stopes's works on family planning such as Wisdom in Reproduction, Love Life in Marriage and Happy Motherhood, which were published several times. She died on 9 October 1927 in Zürich.

Her diaries, which came to the State Library of New South Wales via her nephew Erich, who emigrated to Australia in 2008, from the years 1889 to 1927 have not yet been analysed, although they presumably contain more detailed information about the incident in the Vatican, which had far-reaching consequences for her and her husband's career, the joint collaboration in the magazine Internationale Rundschau, published in Zürich during World War I, and the acquaintance with James Joyce in Zürich. The Feilbogen couple were among a dozen or so old Austrians who had gone to Switzerland as World War exiles and met Joyce there – including Felix Beran, Stefan Zweig and Rudolf Lothar.

== Writings ==
- Franza Feilbogen: Fr. Th. Vischers „Auch Einer“. Eine Studie. Inhaltsverzeichnis Druck und Verlag Art. Institut Orell Füßli, Zürich 1916, DNB-IDN 58085356X (Zugleich Dissertation an der Universität Zürich 1916, Digitalisat im Internet Archive).

== Translation ==
- Shaw Desmond: Körper und Seele. Roman. 2nd edition. 1924, 3. Auflage Orell Füssli, Zürich / Leipzig 1928.

== Literature ==
- Franziska Feilbogen: Diaries, 1889–1927. Katalogeintrag der State Library of New South Wales, March 2008.
- Rudolf Krauss: Rezension der Doktorarbeit von 1916, Deutsche Litteraturzeitung at archive.org, 30. Jahrgang 1917, p. 90, rechte Spalte, 20 January 1917.
