= Franziska Gminder =

German politician

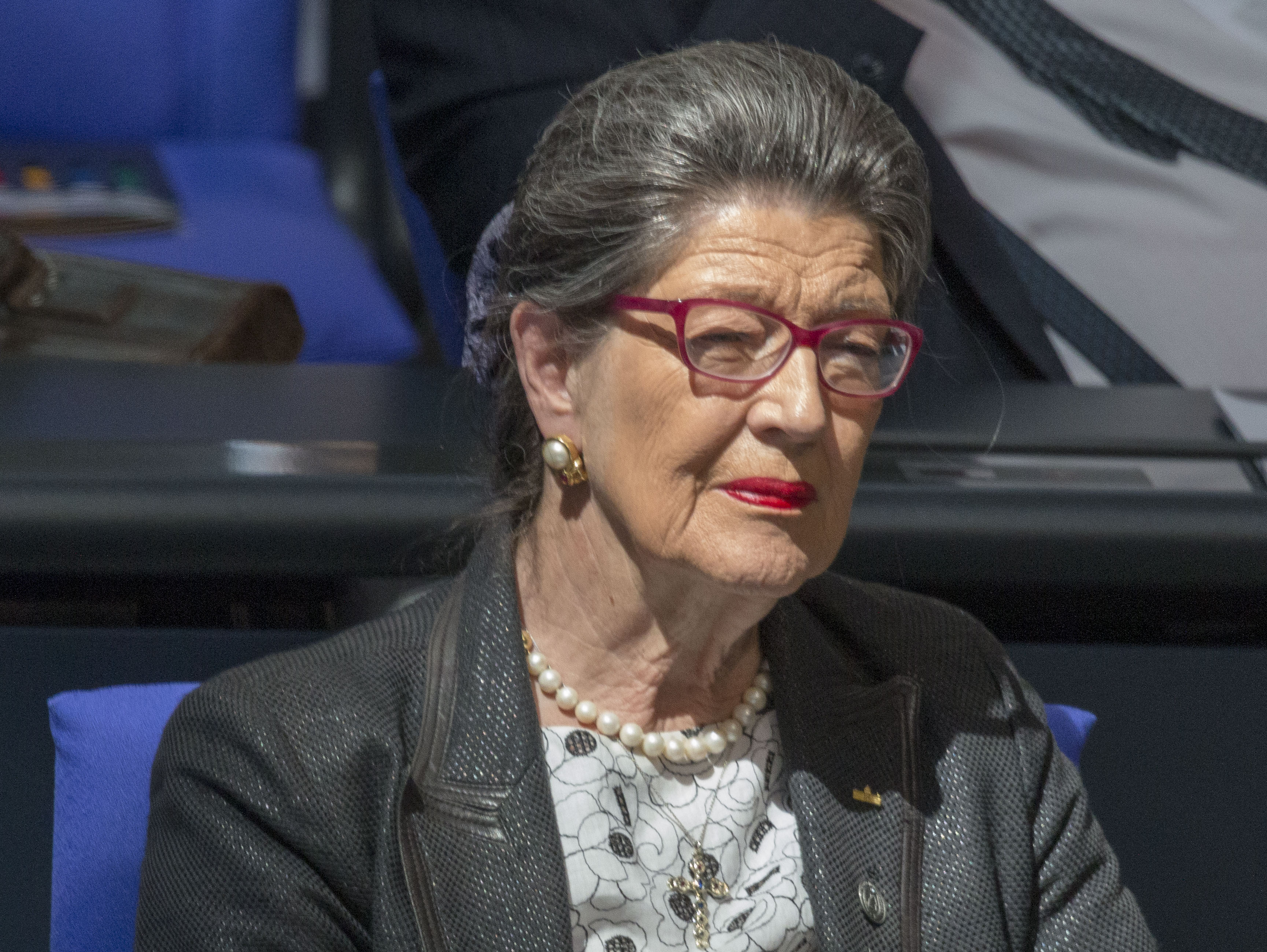
- Gminder in 2020

Member of the Bundestag
- Incumbent
- Assumed office 24 October 2017

Franziska Gminder (born 4 February 1945) is a German politician for the right-wing Alternative for Germany (AfD) and since 2017 member of Bundestag. She is member of the völkisch-nationalistic faction "the wing" within her party.

== Life ==
Gminder was born 1945 in Jablonec nad Nisou (Czech Republic) and studied economics at the Vienna University of Economics and Business (Austria).

Gminder got member of the newly founded AfD in 2013 and became after the 2017 German federal election member of the Bundestag, the primary law-making body.

Gminder is considered to be part of the far right-wing faction of the party: Der Flügel (the wing).
