= Franziska Möllinger =

Swiss photographer (1817–1880)

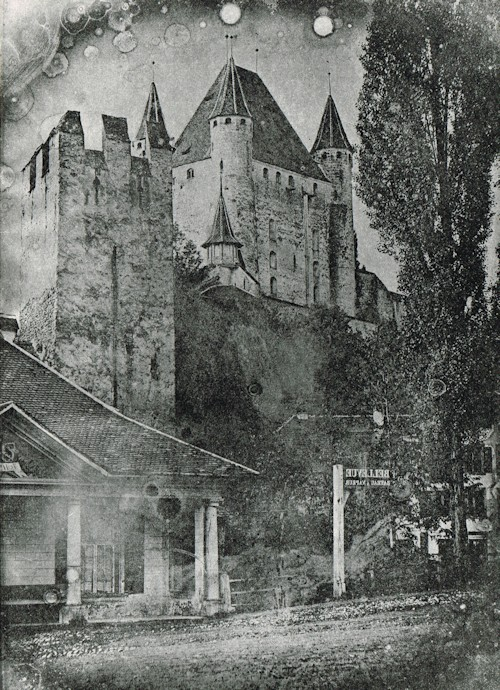
Thun Castle (c.1844), Möllinger's only surviving daguerreotype original

Louise Franziska Möllinger (1817–1880) was a pioneering German-born Swiss photographer who worked with daguerreotypes in the early 1840s. She is thought to be the first female photographer who was active in Switzerland. Möllinger was also the first in Switzerland to use lithography as a means of publishing multiple copies of her landscapes as early as 1844.

== Biography ==
Born on 14 March 1817 in Speyer, Germany, Louise Franziska Möllinger was the second child of the watchmaker David Möllinger and his wife Rosina née Flicht. On David's death in 1834, the family moved to Switzerland.

Throughout her life, Möllinger was very close to her elder brother Otto (1814–1886) who had studied mathematics and physics. From 1836, he was a mathematics teacher at the canton school in Solothurn. From 1842, Möllinger travelled in Switzerland, taking daguerreotype photographs of impressive sights and landscapes. The daguerreotype process had been made commercially available from 1839 and had been demonstrated that year in Switzerland.

It is not very clear why Möllinger became interested in daguerreotypes but it may well have been because her brother Otto was also the editor of the local Solothurn news sheet which, on 4 April 1839, published a report on Daguerre's work. The Solothurner Blatt later reported on progress on daguerreotypes on 28 August 1839. In the December edition, Otto Möllinger reported on progress in even greater detail.

Franziska Möllinger was the first woman to practise photography in Switzerland and one of the first to produce daguerreotypes. As a woman, she was certainly an exception in a profession which was largely reserved for men. As the daguerreotypes could not be reprinted, she translated her images into lithographed views which could then be duplicated. It has been suggested that, like her Swiss male counterpart Johann Baptist Isenring, she travelled with a caravan where she was able to process her dagerrotypes in a darkroom.

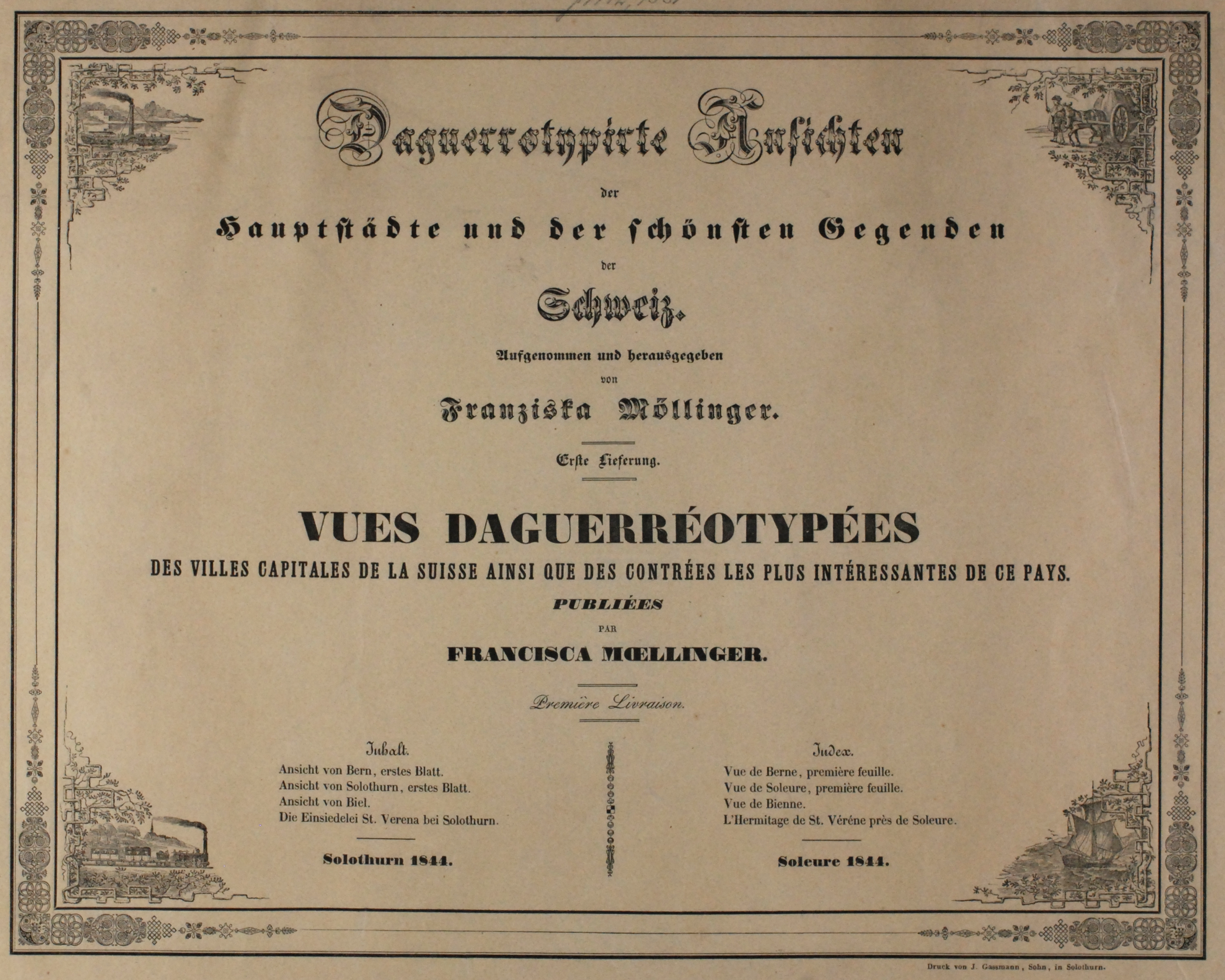
Frontispiece of Mönninger's 1844 collection of 16 lithographs of Swiss rural and city scenes

An advertisement appeared in Solothurner Blatt No. 28 on 8 April 1843 announcing that Franziska Möllinger was also available for taking photographs of individual and family portraits.

In 1844, Möllinger published the first four of the lithographs from her daguerreotypes which she had developed in her studio in Solothurn. The same year, she went on to publish the first book in German of lithographs based on daguerreotypes. It was titled Daguerreotypirte Ansichten der Hauptstädte und der schönsten Gegenden der Schweiz - Vues daguerréotypées des villes capitales de la Suisse ainsi que des contrées les plus intéressantes de ce pays.

Little more is known of Möllinger's life. In 1868, she moved to Zürich with her brother where they opened a private school. This was followed by a similar institution in Fluntern. After a prolonged illness, possibly as a result of mercury poisoning from her photographic processing, Franziska Möllinger died of pulmonary complications in Zürich on 26 February 1880.

== Gallery of Möllinger's lithographs ==
This is a selection of the lithographs Möllinger published in 1844 based on her daguerreotypes:

=== Town scenes ===
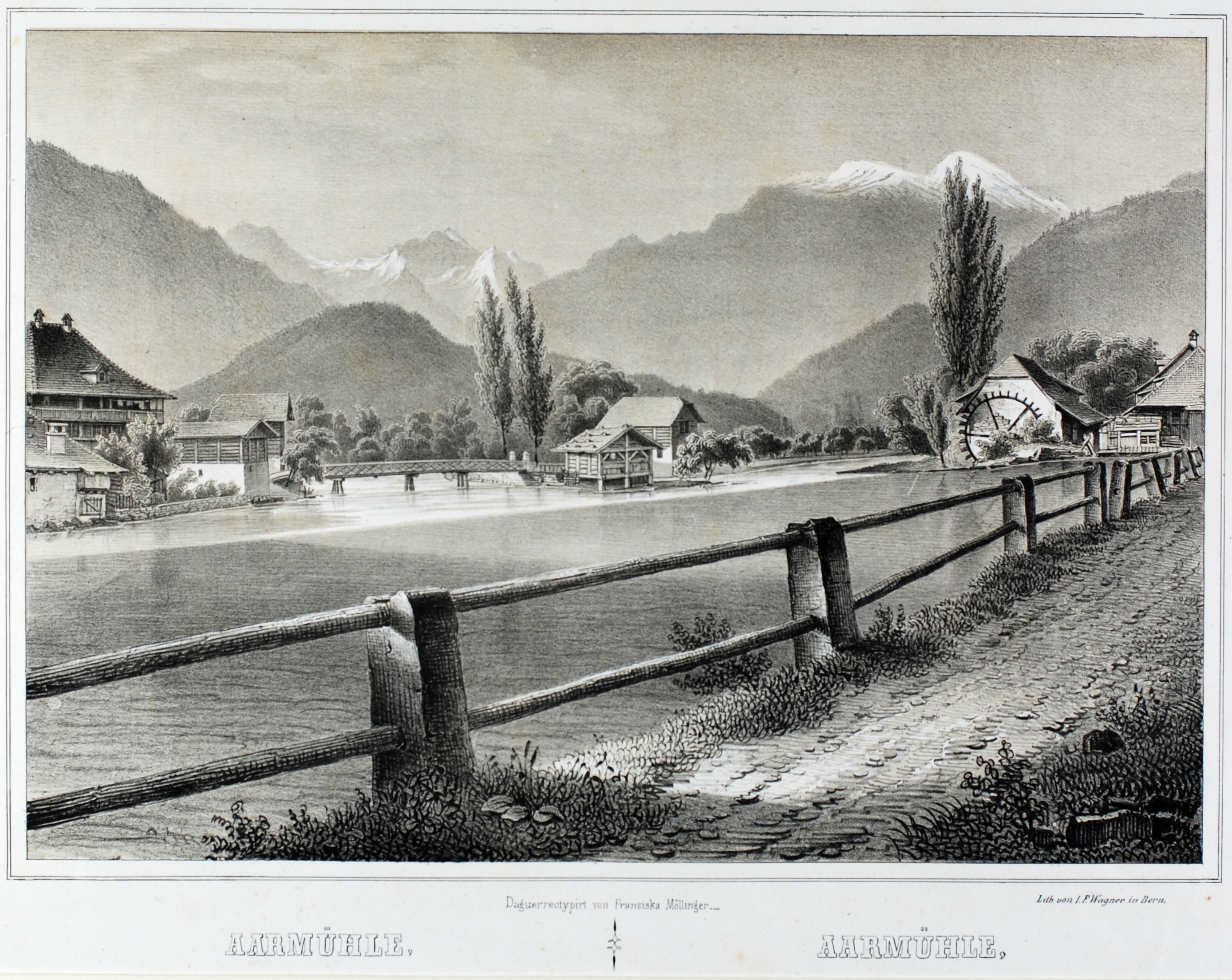
Aarmühle

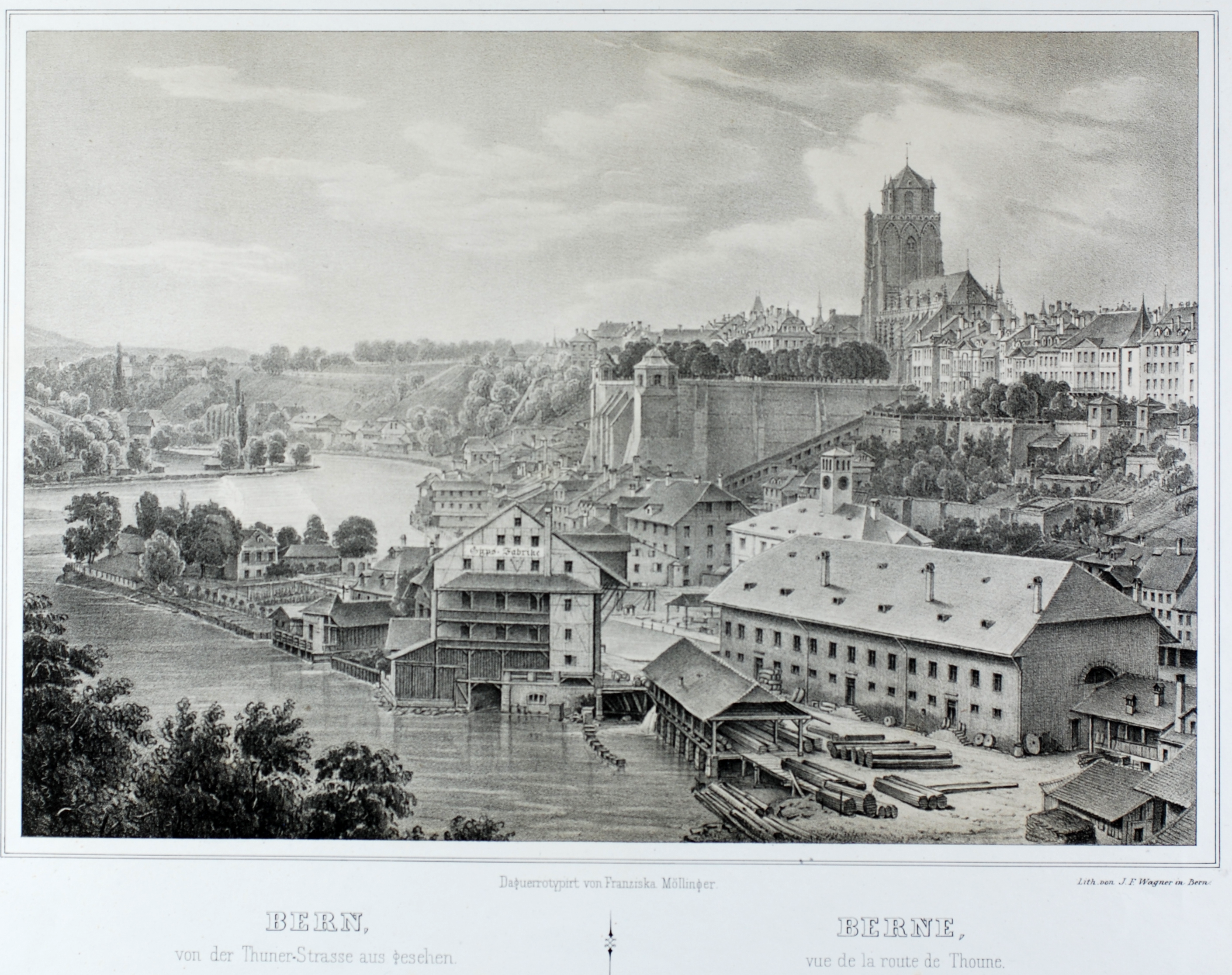
Bern

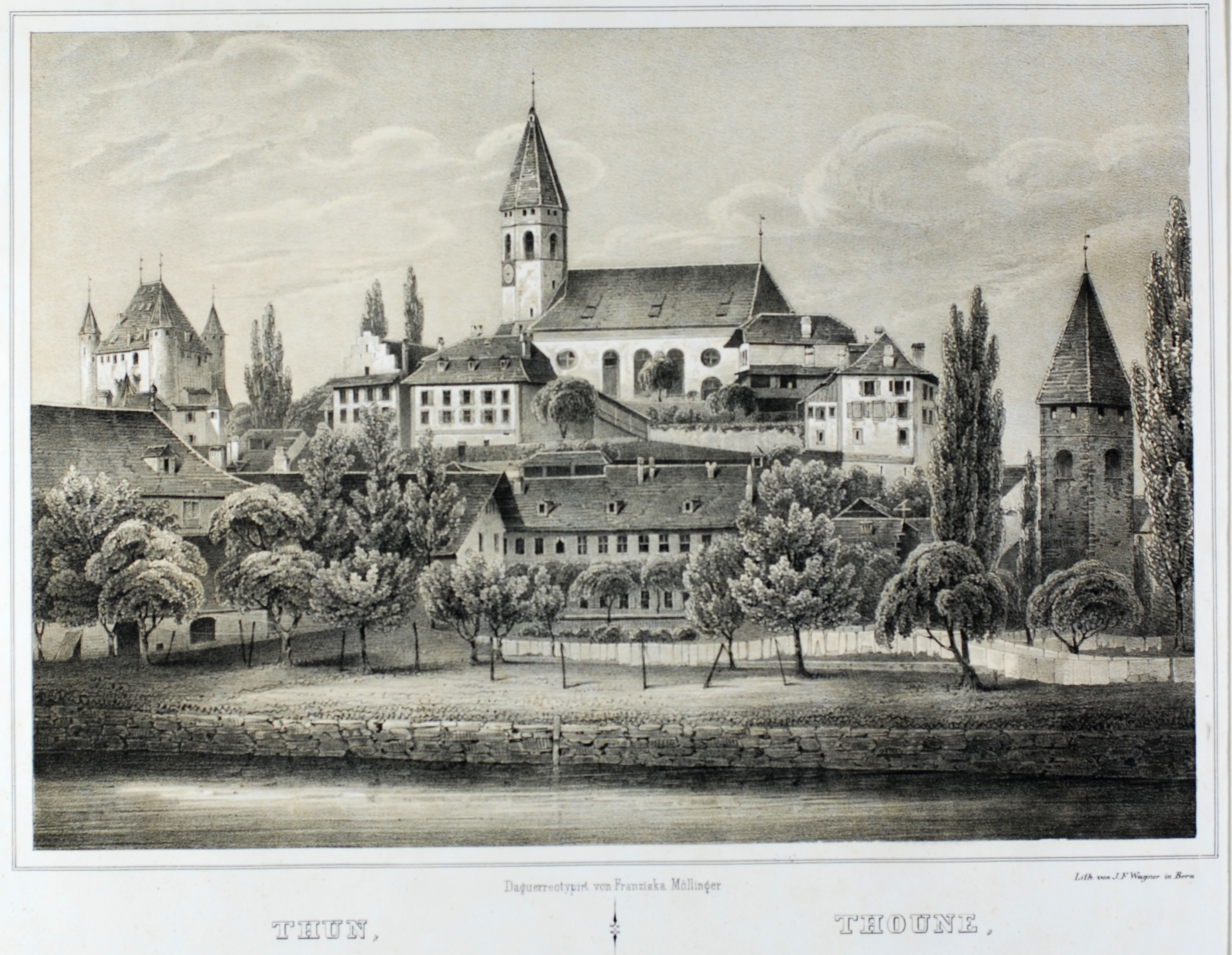
Faulhorn

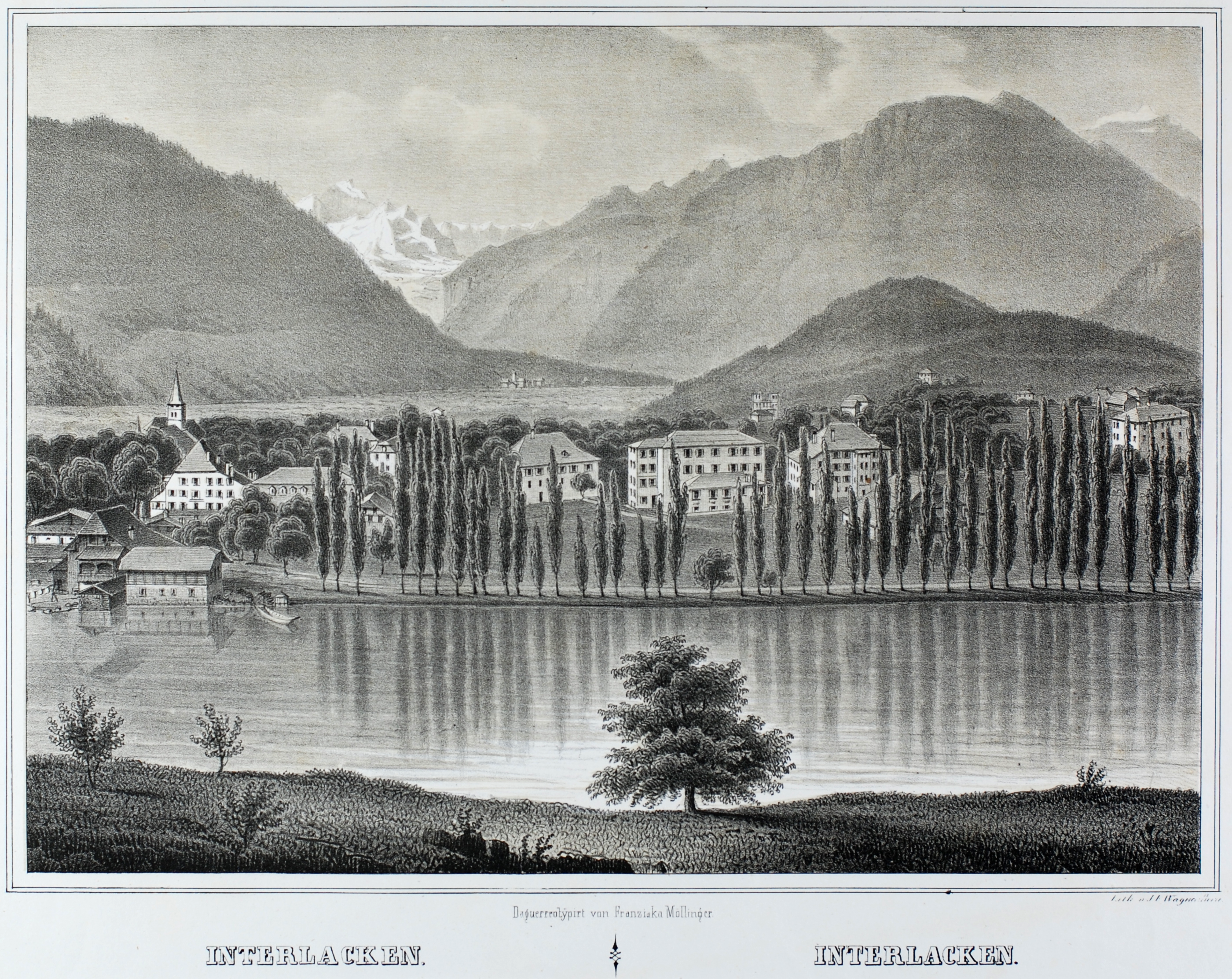
Interlaken

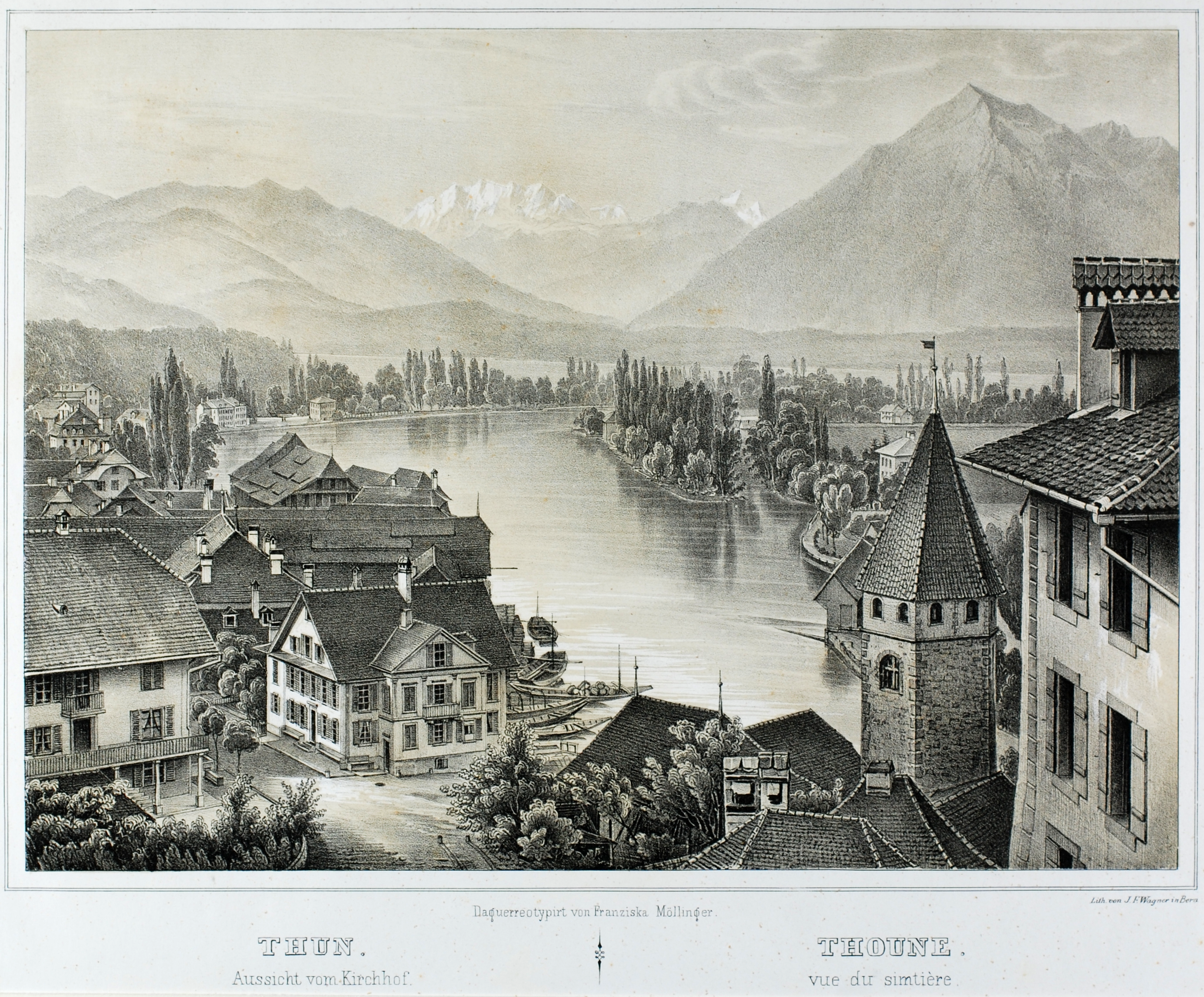
Thun

=== Rural scenes ===
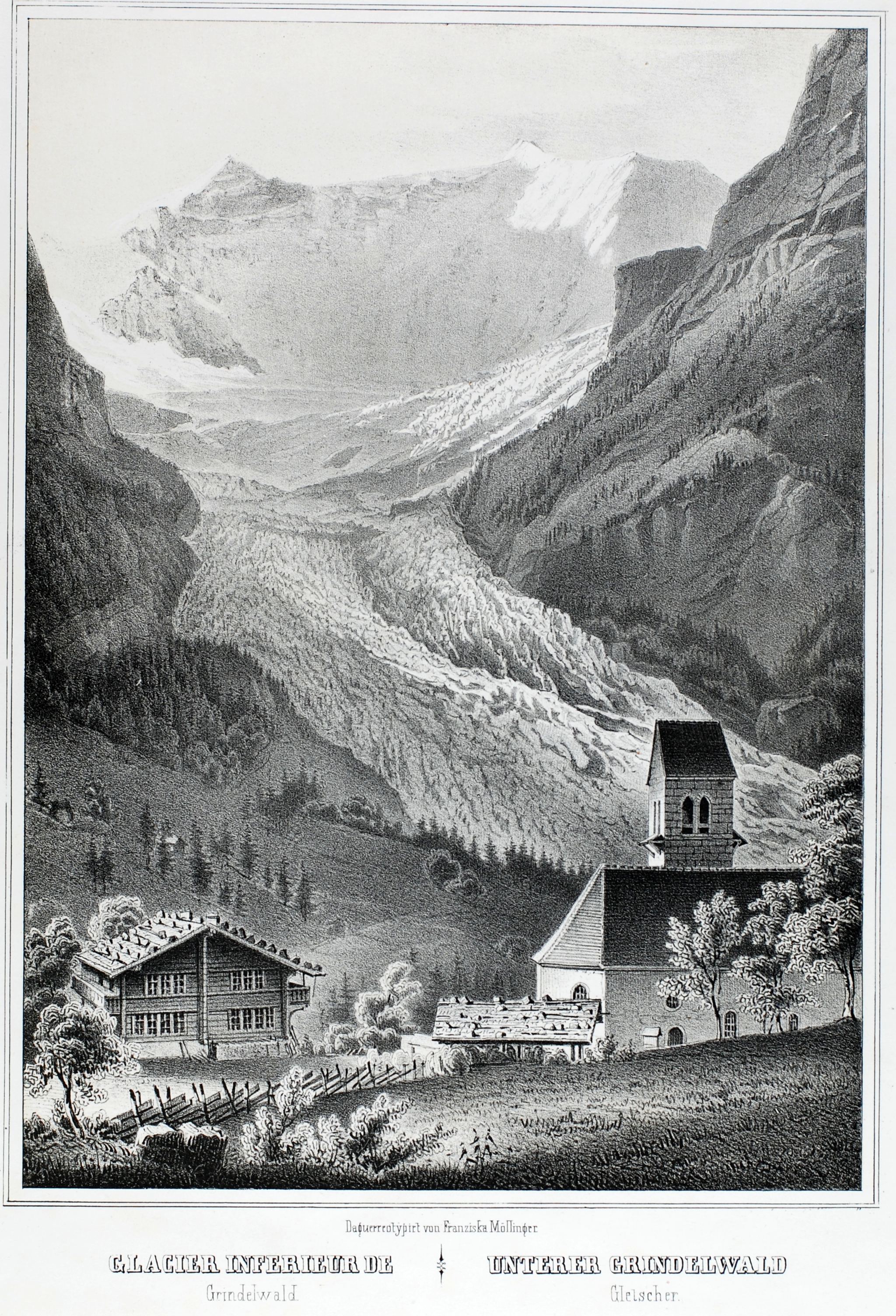
The Grindelwald glacier

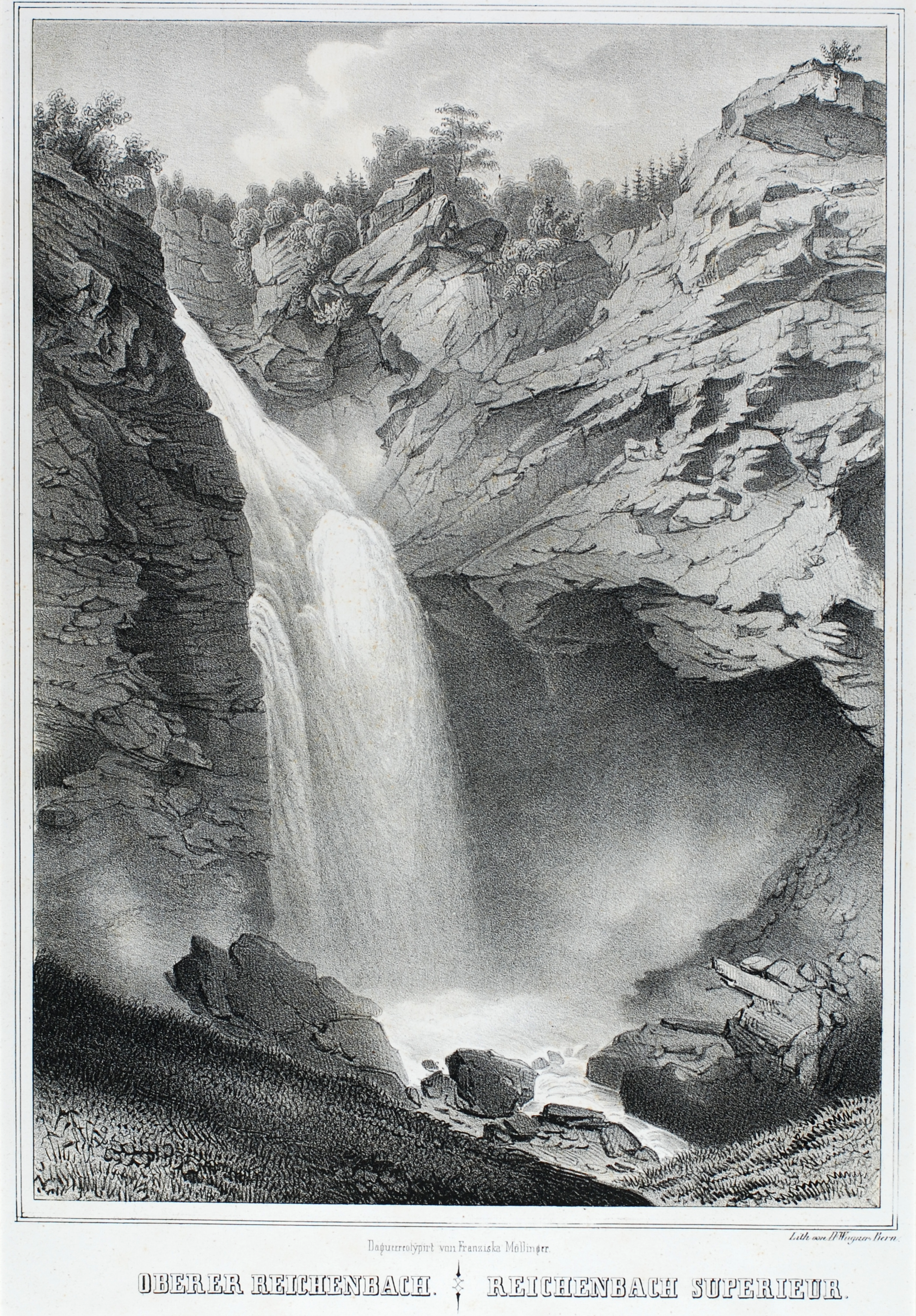
Oberer Reichenbach

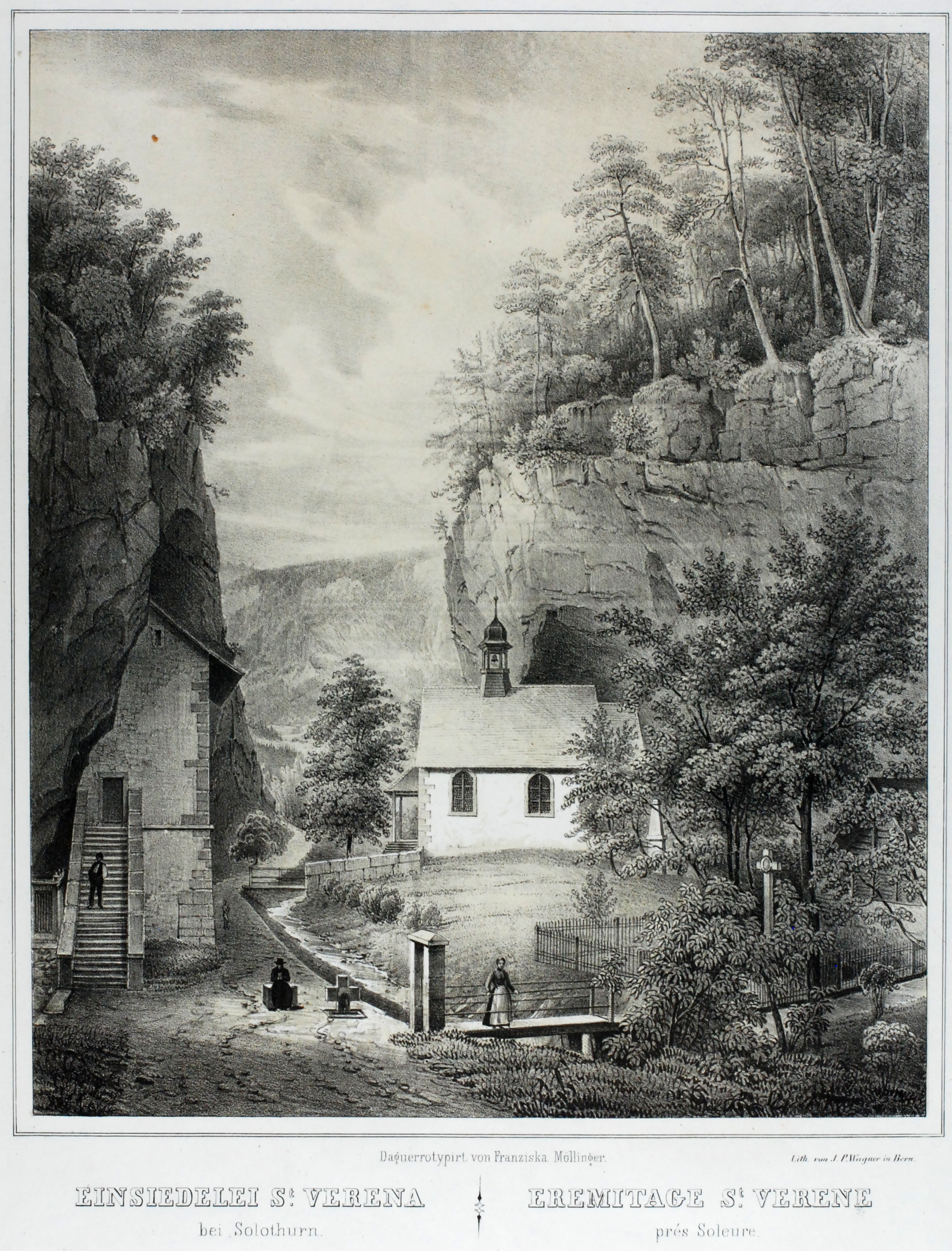
Verena Schlucht

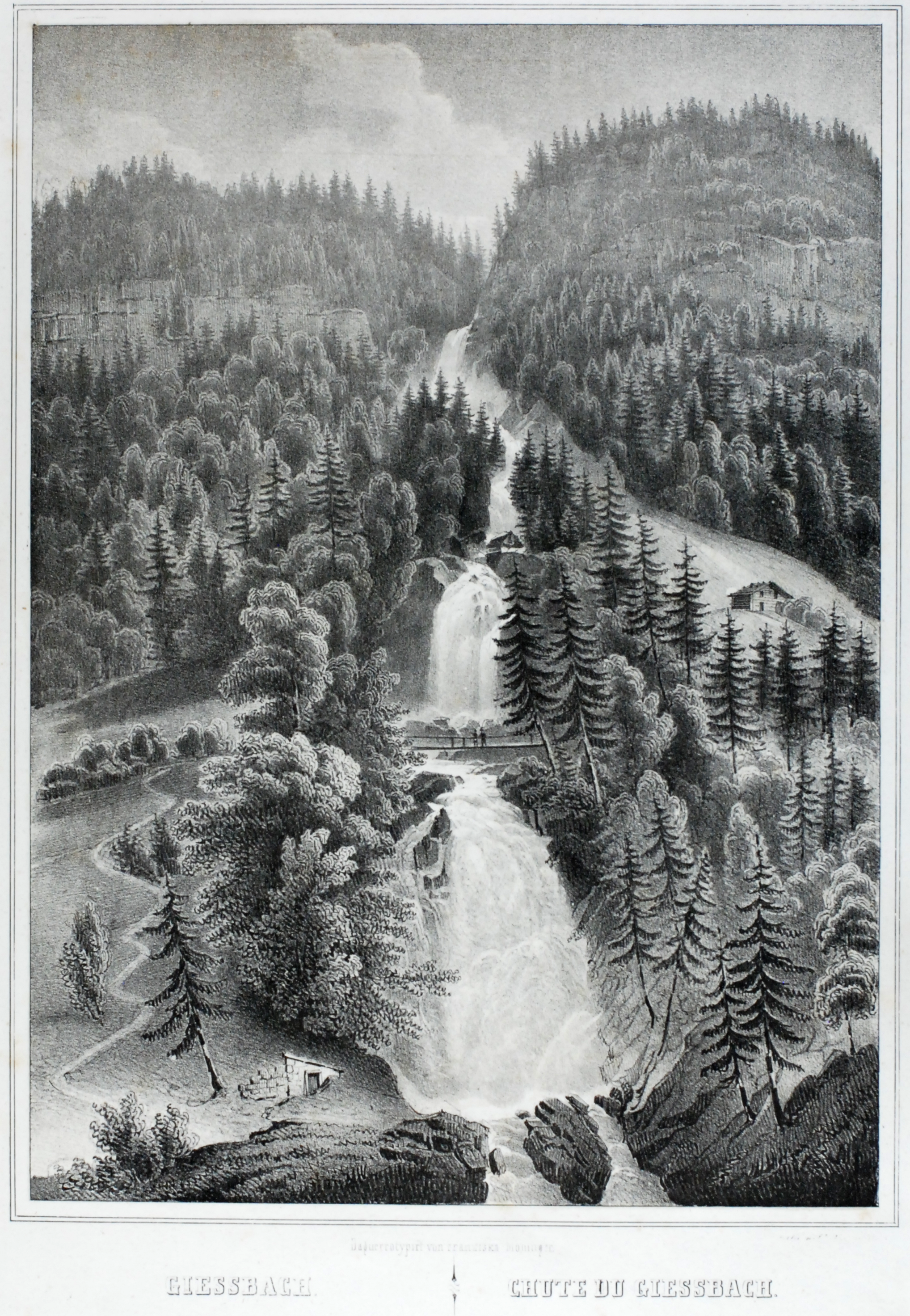
Giessbach
