= Franziska Szegöffy =

Czech stage actress

Franziska Szegöffy (1816–1882) was an actress. She was engaged at the Estates Theatre in Prague in 1854–1874, where she belonged to the theatre's star attractions. She was known for her elder character roles.
