= Franziska Fischer =

German journalist, TV presenter and author

- Born: 2 August 1968 (age 57); Göttingen, Germany
- Education: Theatre studies and journalism
- Occupations: TV presenter, journalist, author
- Notable credit: ZDF-heute-Nachrichten

Franziska Fischer (born 2 August 1968) is a German journalist, TV presenter and author.

== Early life ==
Franziska Fischer was born in 1968 in Göttingen. She studied theatrical studies and journalism in Frankfurt and Berlin and completed several internships at newspaper offices and television stations.

== Career ==
When SFB (now Rundfunk Berlin-Brandenburg) she began as a reporter for the Radio Berlin 88,8 and the Berliner Abendschau. She then moved into the newsroom of Deutsche Welle (DW), where she got her first moderation experience. In 2002 she became a correspondent for three years to Brussels in the European Centre of Deutsche Welle, where she reported on the enlargement of the EU and also moderated the magazine Europa Aktuell.

In early 2009 Fischer joined ZDF. Since October 2009, she has also been a presenter of heute and the representative for Anja Charlet in Heute Mittag. Since the summer of 2010, she has occasionally presented the show Heute – in Deutschland, the weekend editions of heute- News as well as the Sunday Morning News.

Franziska Fischer speaks fluent English and French and has published the book Mrs. Peel, wir werden gebraucht! about the British TV series The Avengers.

== Books ==
- Mrs. Peel, wir werden gebraucht!. Mit Schirm, Charme und Melone; das Buch zur Serie. Bertz Verlag, Berlin 1996, ISBN 3-929470-06-3.
