= Franziska Brychcy =

German politician (born 1984)

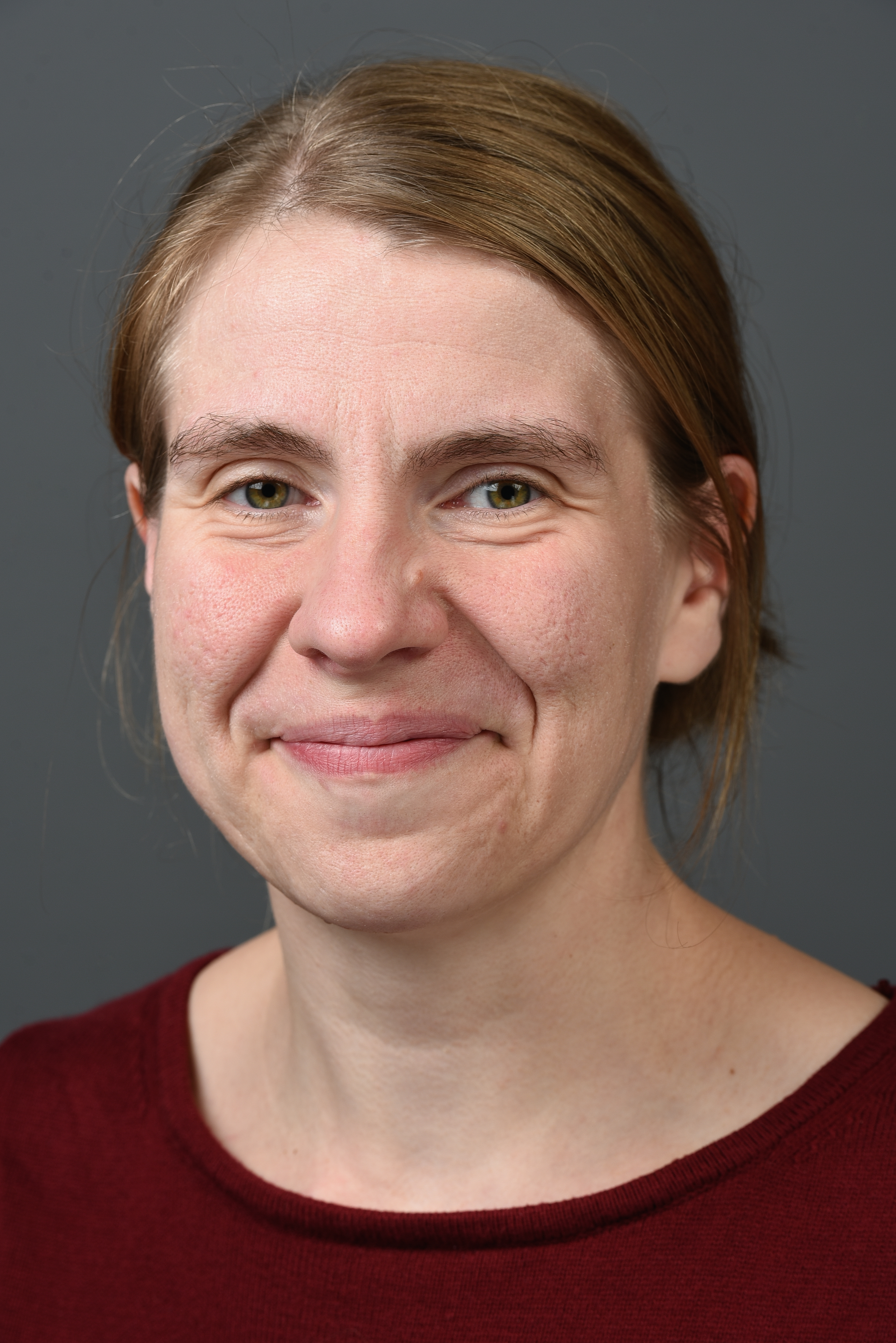
- Brychcy in 2017

Member of the Berlin House of Representatives
- Incumbent
- Assumed office 2016

Personal details
- Born: 1984 (age 41–42) Meissen, Germany
- Party: Die Linke
- Education: Sciences Po; Free University of Berlin

Franziska Brychcy (born 1984) is a German politician from Die Linke. She has been a member of the Berlin House of Representatives since 2016. From 2023 to 2025, she was the chairwoman of Die Linke Berlin.

== Biography ==
Franziska Brychcy grew up in Waltershausen and graduated from the Friedrichroda State Grammar School in 2003. She studied European Affairs – Political Science – at Sciences Po in Paris and the Free University of Berlin, earning a Franco-German double master's degree. During her studies, she worked as an intern in the Protocol and Foreign Affairs Department and in the office of the Commissioner for Franco-German Cultural Cooperation at the Berlin Senate Chancellery.

Brychcy was featured in a television segment "I love both men" from the Westdeutscher Rundfunk series "Menschen hautnah!", which dealt with Brychcy's polyamorous love relationship with her two male partners.

She joined Die Linke through the student and youth association and was chair of the Left Party in Steglitz-Zehlendorf from 2013 to 2022. From 2014 to 2018, she was also deputy chair of Die Linke Berlin. She ran in the 2016 Berlin state election in the Steglitz-Zehlendorf 2 constituency and was elected to the House of Representatives via the state list. In the Berlin House of Representatives, she is her parliamentary group's spokesperson for vocational training and Europe. She is also a member of the Committee on Education, Youth and Family, the Petitions Committee, the Committee on European and Federal Affairs, Media, and the Science Committee. She is particularly active in the policy areas of education and higher education and has been co-spokesperson of the Left Party's Berlin Working Group on Education and Schools since 2018. In her capacity as a member of parliament, she also belongs to the boards of trustees of the Pestalozzi-Fröbel-Haus, the Lette-Verein Berlin and the Berlin State Center for Political Education.

In June 2020, Brychcy ran for co- chair of the Left parliamentary group in the House of Representatives, but lost the vote to Anne Helm and has since been a regular member of the group's executive committee. She was re-elected to the House of Representatives in 2021 and 2023.

On 13 May 2023, she was elected co-chair of the Berlin Left Party alongside Maximilian Schirmer. She did not run for re-election in the 2025 state executive committee election.

Brychcy belongs to the Franco-German Institute and is a member of, among other organizations, the Association of Persecutees of the Nazi Regime – Federation of Antifascists, the KZ-Außenlager Lichterfelde, the Friends of the Friedrich-Drake Elementary School, the Volkssolidarität (People's Solidarity), the Zimmertheater Steglitz Association, the Friends of the Fichtenberg-Oberschule, the Education and Science Workers' Union, the Alliance for an Open-Minded Steglitz-Zehlendorf, the Friends of the Steglitz-Zehlendorf Music School, the Arndt-Gymnasium Dahlem School Support Association, the Berliner MieterGemeinschaft, and the Europa-Union.

== See also ==
- List of members of the 19th Berlin House of Representatives (2021–2023)
- List of members of the 19th Berlin House of Representatives (2023–2026)
