= Johann Baptist Isenring =

Swiss landscape painter and printer (1796–1860)

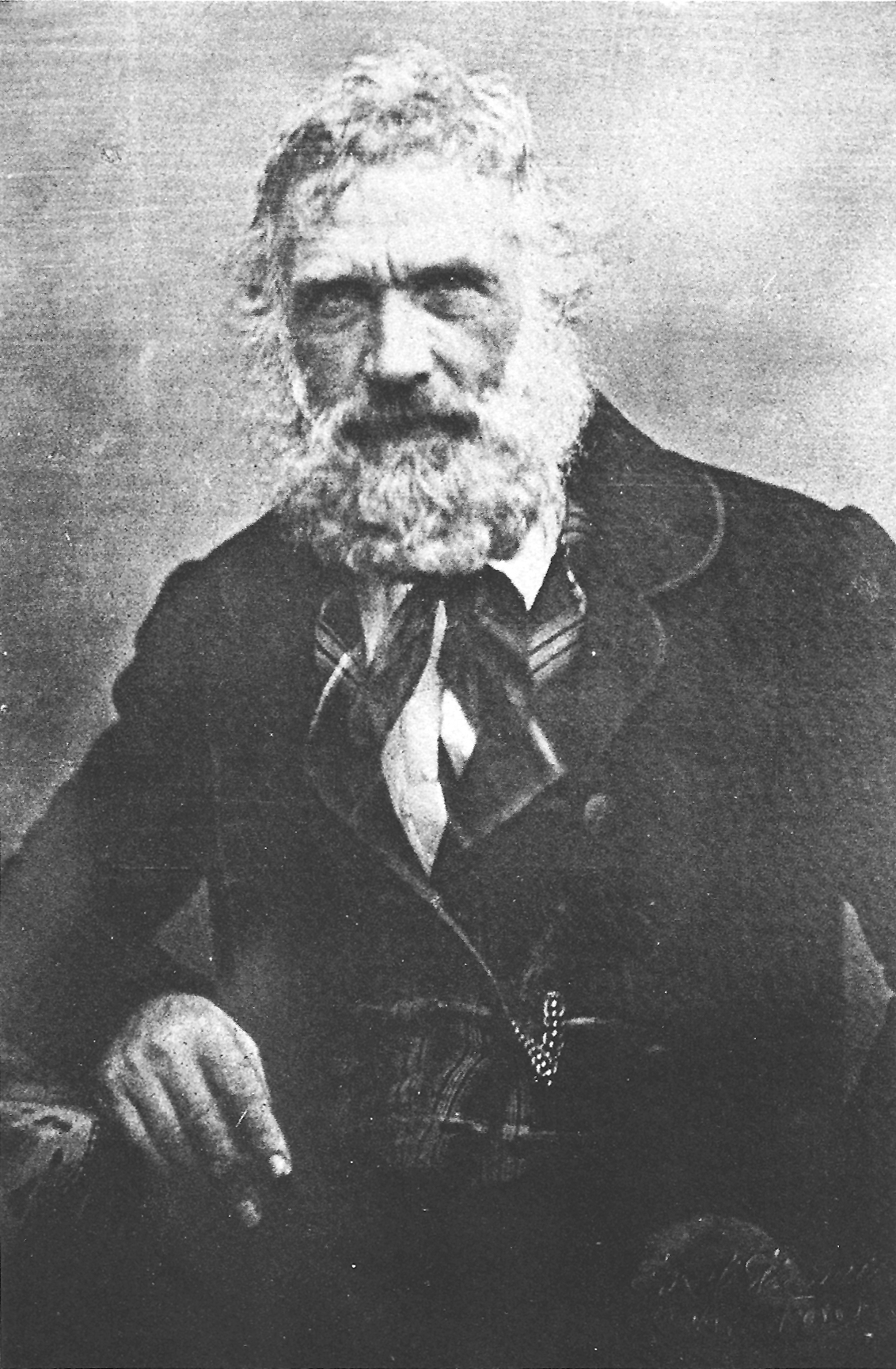
- Johann Baptist Isenring in his sixties (Self-taken Daguerreotype)
- Born: 12 May 1796; Lütisburg, Switzerland
- Died: 9 April 1860 (aged 63); St. Gallen, Switzerland
- Occupations: Landscape painter, printer, photographer
- Known for: First Daguerreotypist in Switzerland

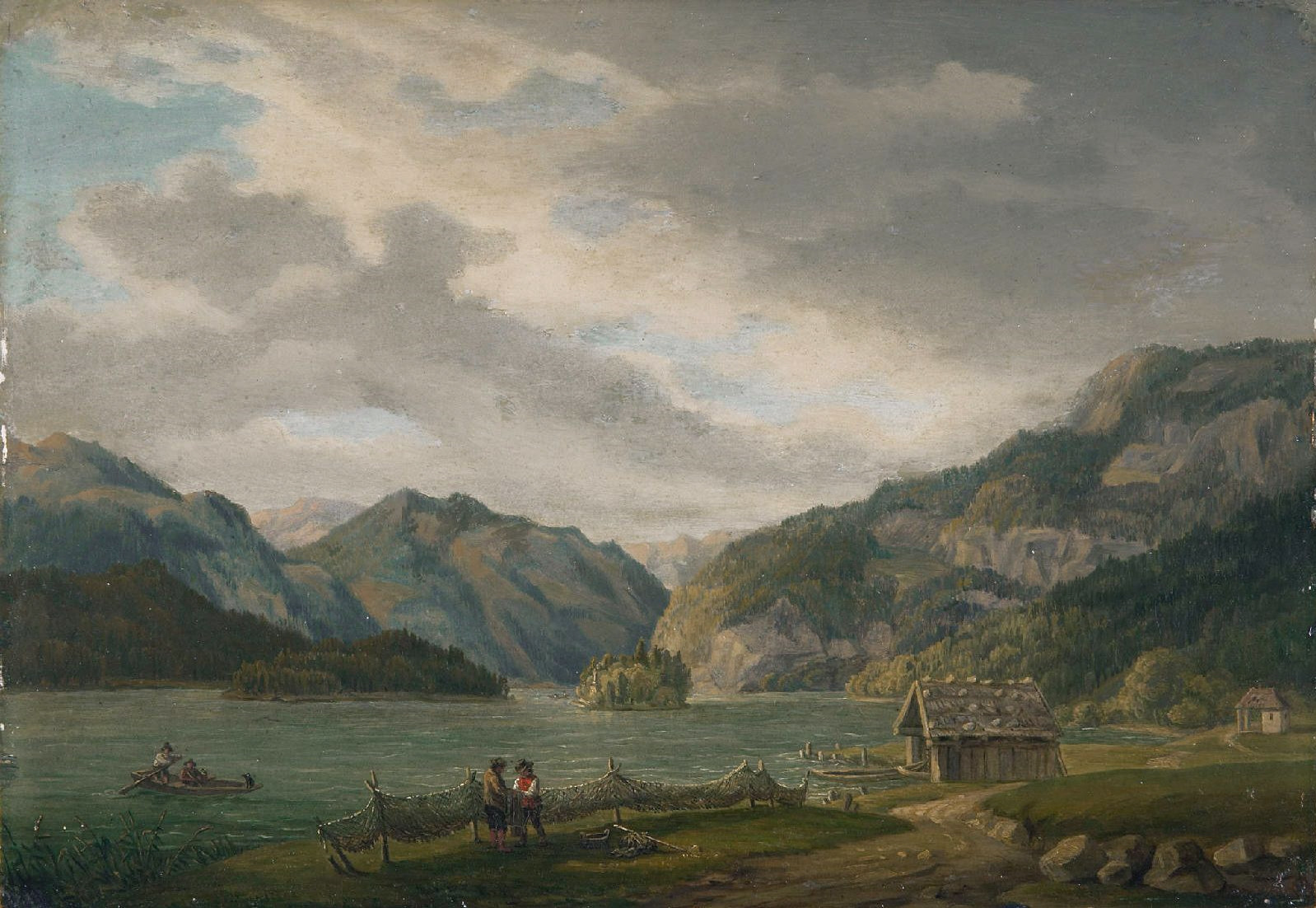
The Königssee at Berchtesgaden (1823)

Johann Baptist Isenring (12 May 1796, Lütisburg - 9 April 1860, St. Gallen) was a Swiss landscape painter and printer. He was also the first Daguerrotypist in Switzerland.

== Life and work ==
As a boy, he completed a carpentry apprenticeship in Zürich. From 1816 to 1817, he travelled to Munich and Vienna, working as a house painter and gilder. Thanks to a stipendium from the Canton of St. Gallen, he was able to enroll at the Academy of Fine Arts, Munich, in 1820, where he studied landscape painting and watercolors. In 1823, he returned to St. Gallen and, by 1825, began self-publishing a series of aquatints called Thurgegenden. In 1828, he opened an art shop and, in 1831, published what would be his largest collection of lithographs. Picturesque Views of the Most Remarkable Cities and Places in Switzerland (Malerischer Ansichten der merkwürdigsten Städte und Flecken der Schweiz).

In 1839, as soon as he heard about the invention of the Daguerreotype, he acquired a camera in Paris and became Switzerland's first photographer. In August 1840, he presented one of the world's first photography exhibitions, with cityscapes, portraits and art reproductions, for which he printed a four-page catalog. The exhibition was taken on the road and shown in Zürich, Munich, Augsburg, Vienna and Stuttgart. In 1841, he opened a "Studio for Heliography" in Munich.

That same year, he produced the first colored Daguerreotypes, using a mixture of gum arabic and pigments. The dyed powder was applied with fine brushes and fixed to the surface with a heat treatment. He patented this technique. The proceeds from his first eight months of royalties was used to purchase his "Sonnenwagen" (Sun Car), a photography studio on wheels with a built-in darkroom; the first of its kind.

He was aware of the shortcomings of being able to produce only one copy of each photograph, so he began working on a duplication technique. Originally, he tried setting several cameras side by side or on top of each other and triggering them simultaneously, but the results were not consistent. He never solved the problem to his satisfaction.

For many years, he worked as a travelling photographer throughout Switzerland and Southern Germany, until his physical condition was no longer up to the effort. He then settled in St. Gallen, where he worked primarily as a landscape painter and engraver.

Most of his photographic work has not been preserved.
