= Treptow-Köpenick 5 =

State electoral district of Germany

- Electoral district for the Berlin House of Representatives
- Treptow-Köpenick 5 in 2023
- District: Treptow-Köpenick
- Electorate: 31,010 (2026)

Current electoral district
- Party: AfD
- Member: Denis Henkel

Treptow-Köpenick 5 is an electoral constituency (German: Wahlkreis) represented in the House of Representatives of Berlin. It elects one member via first-past-the-post voting.

== Geography ==
In 2023, the constituency comprised the districts of Altstadt/Kietz, Allende-Viertel, Wendenschloss, and Müggelheim. It is entirely within the borough of Treptow-Köpenick.

There were 31,010 eligible voters in 2026.

== Members ==
Election	Member	Party	%
1995	Jochen Querengässer	PDS	30.3
1999	Uwe Doering	PDS	35.3
2001	Uwe Doering	PDS	37.2
2006	Tom Schreiber	SPD	34.4
2011	Tom Schreiber	SPD	30.9
2016	Tom Schreiber	SPD	26.3
2021	Tom Schreiber	SPD	26.0
2023	Martin Sattelkau	CDU	27.7
2026	Denis Henkel	AfD	24.9

== Election results ==
=== 2026 election ===
State election (2026): Treptow-Köpenick 5
Notes:	Blue background denotes the winner of the electorate vote. Pink background denotes a candidate elected from their party list. Yellow background denotes an electorate win by a list member, or other incumbent. A ✓ or ✗ denotes status of any incumbent, win or lose respectively.						
Party	Candidate	Votes	%	±%	Party votes	%	±%
AfD	Denis Henkel	5,721	24.9	▲10.7	5,664	24.5	▲10.2
Left	Loic Kliemann	5,639	24.6	▲10.5	5,639	24.3	▲9.6
CDU	Lisa Knack	4,072	17.8	▼7.7	3,706	16.0	▼10.0
SPD	Robert Schaddach	3,004	13.1	▼10.4	2,415	10.4	▼8.6
Greens	Henriette Spiering	2,060	9.0	▼2.1	2,223	9.6	▼2.2
BSW	Svend Simdorn	1,294	5.6		1,420	6.1	
Tierschutzpartei					614	2.7	▼0.6
Volt	Tim Prange	621	2.7		526	2.3	▲1.5
FDP	Claudius Weisensee	527	2.3	▼1.4	536	2.3	▼2.0
PARTEI					223	1.0	▼0.7
PdF					81	0.3	
ÖDP					41	0.2	▲0.1
HEIMAT					31	0.1	Steady
du.					19	0.1	Steady
DKP					18	0.1	▼0.1
SGP					4	0.0	
Informal votes		497			275		
Total valid votes		22,938			23,160		
Turnout		23,435	75.6	▲13.1			
AfD gain from CDU	Majority	82	0.3				

=== 2023 repeat election ===
Changes denoted below for the 2023 election are compared to the 2016 election, as the 2021 election was declared invalid.

State election (2023): Treptow-Köpenick 5
Notes:	Blue background denotes the winner of the electorate vote. Pink background denotes a candidate elected from their party list. Yellow background denotes an electorate win by a list member, or other incumbent. A ✓ or ✗ denotes status of any incumbent, win or lose respectively.						
Party	Candidate	Votes	%	±%	Party votes	%	±%
CDU	Martin Sattelkau	5,180	27.7	▲14.2	5,165	27.6	▲15.2
SPD	Tom Schreiber	4,279	22.8	▼3.4	3,532	18.9	▼2.4
AfD	Martin Trefzer	3,378	18.1	▼6.7	3,297	17.6	▼6.6
Left	Stefanie Fuchs	2,792	14.9	▼8.2	2,777	14.8	▼7.5
Greens	Alexander Reinfeldt	1,294	6.9	▲0.3	1,313	7.0	▲1.1
FDP	Anastasia Weimer	625	3.3		768	4.1	▼0.3
Tierschutzpartei					482	2.6	▲0.8
PARTEI	Cinco Jeschke	467	2.5		284	1.5	▲0.1
The Grays					155	0.8	
FW	Matthias Hentschler	297	1.6		124	0.7	
Gray Panthers					118	0.6	▼0.5
dieBasis	Maria Eva Machleidt	151	0.8		92	0.5	
Volt					91	0.5	
Verjüngungsforschung					77	0.4	▼0.3
NPD	Udo Voigt	98	0.5	▼1.0	72	0.4	▼1.1
DKP					53	0.3	Steady
Mieterpartei					49	0.3	
Pirates					45	0.2	▼1.1
Bildet Berlin!					44	0.2	
Team Todenhöfer					34	0.2	
Humanists					33	0.2	
ÖDP	Mareen Bahl	90	0.5		27	0.1	
Klimaliste					23	0.1	
du.					21	0.1	
LKR	Randy Witte	48	0.3		17	0.1	▼0.3
The Pinks/Alliance 21					17	0.1	
BüSo					15	0.1	Steady
Bergpartei, die ÜberPartei					4	0.0	
SGP					3	0.0	▼0.1
Informal votes		202			157		
Total valid votes		18,699			18,732		
Turnout		28,918	64.1	▼4.8			
CDU gain from SPD	Majority	901	4.8				

=== 2021 election (annulled) ===
The election in 2021 was annulled and rerun in 2023.

State election (2021): Treptow-Köpenick 5
Notes:	Blue background denotes the winner of the electorate vote. Pink background denotes a candidate elected from their party list. Yellow background denotes an electorate win by a list member, or other incumbent. A ✓ or ✗ denotes status of any incumbent, win or lose respectively.						
Party	Candidate	Votes	%	±%	Party votes	%	±%
SPD	✓ Tom Schreiber	5,780	26.0	▼0.3	5,153	23.1	▲1.8
Left	Stefanie Fuchs	4,100	18.4	▼4.7	3,993	17.9	▼4.5
CDU	Martin Sattelkau	3,404	15.3	▲1.8	3,361	15.0	▲2.6
AfD	Martin Trefzer	3,291	14.8	▼10.0	3,265	14.6	▼9.6
Greens	Alexander Reinfeldt	1,812	8.1	▲1.5	1,902	8.5	▲2.6
FDP	Anastasia Weimer	1,302	5.9		1,566	7.0	▲2.6
Tierschutzpartei	?	850	3.8		622	2.8	▲1.0
PARTEI	Cinco Jeschke	472	2.1		385	1.7	▲0.3
FW	Matthias Hentschler	434	2.0		335	1.5	
dieBasis	Maria Eva Machleidt	363	1.6		285	1.3	
The Grays					220	1.0	
Gray Panthers					178	0.8	▼0.3
Volt					130	0.6	
APT					122	0.5	
LKR	Randy Witte	203	0.9		110	0.5	▲0.1
NPD	Udo Voigt	154	0.7	▼0.9	119	0.5	▼1.0
Pirates					100	0.4	▼0.9
Verjüngungsforschung					93	0.4	▼0.3
Klimaliste					56	0.3	
Mieterpartei					55	0.2	
Bildet Berlin!					50	0.2	
Team Todenhöfer					48	0.2	
Humanists					44	0.2	
ÖDP	Mareen Bahl	74	0.3		42	0.2	
DKP					34	0.2	▼0.2
du.					29	0.1	
The Pinks/Alliance 21					16	0.1	
BüSo					15	0.1	▼0.1
Bergpartei, die ÜberPartei					8	0.0	
SGP					6	0.0	▼0.1
Informal votes		329			296		
Total valid votes		22,239			22,342		
Turnout		22,667	76.0	▲7.2			
SPD hold	Majority	1,680	7.6				

== See also ==
- Politics of Berlin
- House of Representatives of Berlin
