= Franziska Maichle =

German singer

- Born: 1992 (age 32–33); Hechingen, Germany
- Occupation(s): model, singer

Franziska Maichle (born 1992 in Hechingen) is a German singer.

== Life and work ==
Franziska ("Franzi") Maichle became famous through the German talent show Deutschland sucht den Superstar in 2009 and the dating game show Der Bachelor, which is the German version of The Bachelor, in 2016. Although she had the best chances of winning, she left the show voluntarily, as she did not fall in love with the "bachelor" Leonard Freier. In addition to her television career Franziska studies economics at the University of Stuttgart.
