= Fränzi =

Fränzi or Franzi is a given name or nickname. Notable people with the name include:

- Fränzi Aufdenblatten, Swiss World Cup alpine ski racer
- Franzi Groszmann, writer
- Fränzi Mägert-Kohli (born 1976), Swiss snowboarder
- Fränzi Schmidt (born 1943), Swiss figure skater
- Franziska van Almsick, swimmer
- Lina Franziska Fehrmann, child model and muse of the Brücke artists

== See also ==
- Franziska (disambiguation)
