= Franziska Meissner-Diemer =

Austrian opinion journalist and writer (1841–1919)

- Born: 10 October 1841; Graz
- Died: 16 June 1919 (aged 77); Vienna
- Resting place: Vienna Central Cemetery
- Occupation: Opinion journalist
- Spouse: Dr Leopold Florian Meissner

Franziska Meissner-Diemer, also known as Fanny Meissner, was an Austrian opinion journalist, writer and social worker. She was born on 10 October 1841, in Graz and died on 16 June 1919 in Vienna.

== Life ==
Fanny Meissner moved to Vienna with her family when she was two years old, as her father Dr Josef Diemer became the head of the University of Vienna Library. Dr Josef Diemer was a Germanist, who became known with the discovery and publication of German Poems From the 11th and 12th Centuries and later became a government councilor of the Austrian Empire.

Meissner began publishing periodical reviews early on. On 19 September 1863 she married Dr Leopold Florian Meissner (died 29 April 1895), a police commissioner, who would go on to become a court attorney, long-time mayor of Währing and writer. The marriage remained childless.

== Social engagement ==
In 1882, Meissner founded the Währing-Hernals-Ottakring branch of the Austrian Red Cross, of which she also became a president, as well as the women's local group of the Deutscher Schulverein (German School Association) in Währing, which she chaired in addition to the women's and girl's local group in Währing. She was the president of the Red Cross women's help society and secretary of the women's group "Innere Stadt Wien" (Inner City Vienna) of the school association. In 1896, Meissner joined the committee of the Wiener Frauenerwerbverein (Vienna Women's Employment Society).

In 1897, Meissner was a delegate to the patriotic aid association at the International Conference of the Red Cross in Vienna. She also organized funds for a 900-bed reserve hospital through elite balls, picnics, and events. In 1903, Meissner was a substitute member of the federal leadership of the Red Cross and – as the only commoner – second vice president from 1911 to 1918.

== Work ==
As Dr Leopold Florian Meissner fell seriously ill, he dictated his memories to his wife (published in 1892 by Reclam under the title From the Papers of a Police Commissioner ). After his death, the widow published the Christmas games written by her husband, which were famous in Vienna at the time.

Franziska Meissner's own journalistic work began with publications, partly after lectures that she had given for the Red Cross and the German School Association. Nursing Care in Wartimes and the Women's Aid From the Oldest Ages Up To the Geneva Conventions and The German Elementary School From Its Beginnings Up To Maria Theresa and Frederick the Great were published by the "German Association for the Dissemination of non-profit Knowledge" in Prague. In addition, Meissner wrote political, partly historical essays for Viennese daily and weekly papers and published in calendars, yearbooks, etc. of patriotic and educational associations.

Meissner also dealt with the legal situation of women in Austria and gave the lecture "Women's rights in Austria" at the 1st International Women's Congress in Berlin on 25 September 1896.

== Resting place ==
Fanny Meissner's final resting place is at the Vienna Central Cemetery (group 27A, row 1, number G2).

== Publications ==
- Die deutsche Volks-Schule in ihren Anfängen bis zu Maria Theresia und Friedrich dem Großen. Prag 1886 (Signatur der ÖNB: 393.143-B.117)
- Die Krankenpflege im Kriege und die Hilfeleistung der Frauen von den ältesten Zeiten bis zum Vertrag von Genf. Prag 1887 (Signatur der ÖNB: 393143-B.120)
- Fünfundzwanzig Jahre im Dienste des Roten Kreuzes. Jasper, Wien 1907 (Signatur der ÖNB: 450876-B)

== Literature ==
- Ludwig Eisenberg, Richard Groner: Das geistige Wien: Künstler- und Schriftsteller-Lexikon. Wien 1889–1893.
- Marianne Nigg: Biographien der österreichischen Dichterinnen und Schriftstellerinnen. Ein Beitrag zur deutschen Literatur in Österreich. Korneuburg 1893.
- H. Meißner: "Meissner, Franziska". In: Österreichisches Biographisches Lexikon 1815–1950 (ÖBL). Vol. 6, Austrian Academy of Sciences, Vienna 1975, ISBN 3-7001-0128-7, p. 201.

== See also ==
- University of Vienna
