= Franziska Emmerling =

German chemist

Franziska L. Emmerling
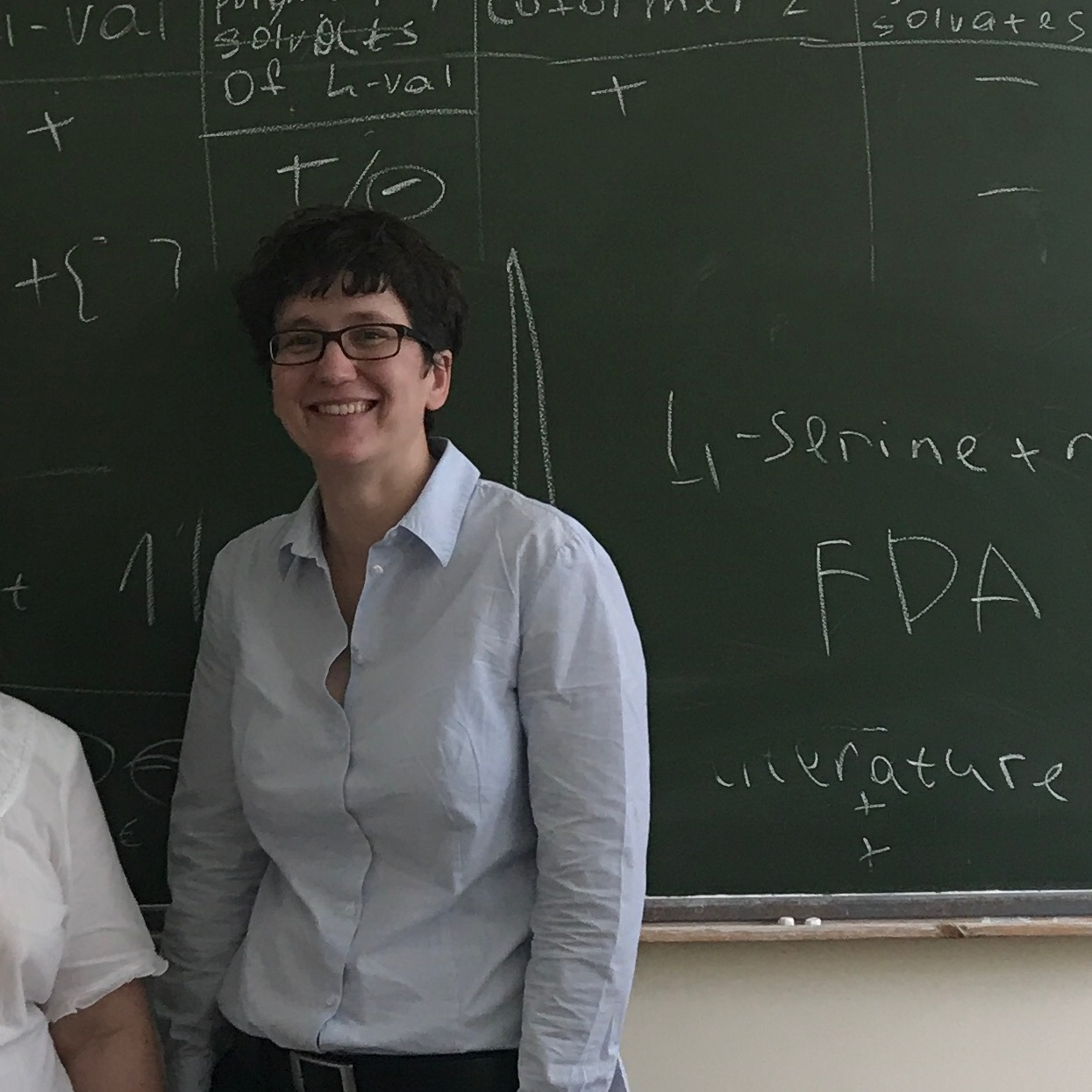
- Education: Albert-Ludwig University of Freiburg
- Scientific career
- Workplaces: Bundesanstalt fuer Materialforschung und -pruefung

Franziska L. Emmerling (born 1975) is a German chemist. Emmerling is Head of Materials Chemistry Department and Head of the Structure Analysis Division at the German Federal Institute for Materials Research and Testing (BAM). She is also a professor at Humboldt University.

== Early life and education ==
Emmerling was born in Bad Dürkheim. She studied chemistry at Albert-Ludwig University, and completed her PhD at the same institution in 2003. Her doctoral work focused on the synthesis and structural investigation of intermetallic phases and ternary oxides of the elements arsenic, antimony and bismuth in unusual valence states.

== Research and career ==
Emmerling conducted post-doctoral research in the group of Prof. Claudia Felser at Johannes Gutenberg University in Mainz. In 2005, Emmerling moved to the Federal Institute for Materials Research and Testing (BAM) in Berlin as head of the working group on X-ray structure analysis. From 2010 until 2013 she held a guest professorship in inorganic chemistry at Humboldt University in Berlin. In 2012 Emmerling became Head of the Division ‘Structure Analysis’ at BAM, before becoming Head of Department Analytical Sciences and Reference Materials in 2017. Emmerling achieved her habilitation in chemistry in 2018 focusing on in situ analysis of mechanochemical reaction.

The current work of Emmerling focuses on the investigation of crystallization and aggregation phenomena by means of synchrotron radiation. She is also well known for her advances in mechanochemistry and for developing new methods to monitor mechanochemical reactions in situ. Emmerling develops and uses time-resolved experiments applying synchrotron X-rays, supplemented with additional analytic methods including Raman spectroscopy and XANES.

In 2019, Emmerling was elected as a member of the Analytical Chemistry Division of the International Union of Pure and Applied Chemistry (IUPAC) Currently, she is Head of Materials Chemistry Department and Head of the Structure Analysis Division at the German Federal Institute for Materials Research and Testing (BAM).
