= Franziska Huhn =

German-American harpist

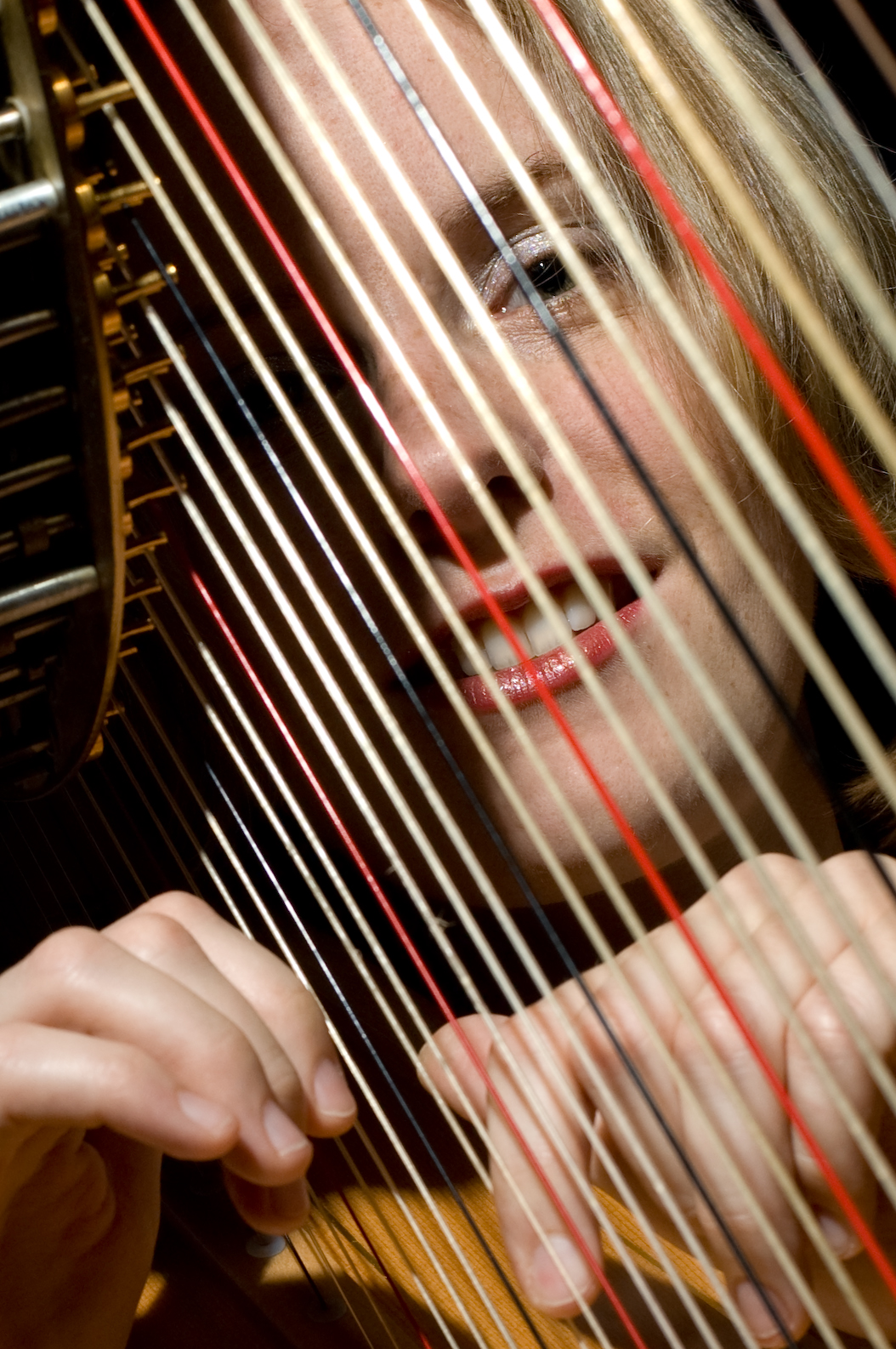

Background information
- Born: 1977 (age 48–49); Berlin, Germany
- Genres: Classical music
- Occupations: Harpist, musician, teacher, lecturer
- Instrument: Harp
- Years active: 1991–present
- Website: www.franziskahuhn.de

Franziska Huhn (born 1977 in Berlin, Germany) is a German harpist. Currently, she lives in the United States.

== Early life and education ==
Franziska Huhn was born in Berlin, Germany in 1977. She began with harp playing at the age of nine. When she was 14, she won the German prize Jugend musiziert. On a fellowship, she studied at Boston University with Lucile Lawrence and graduated with a Bachelor of Music degree. She continued her studies with Ann Hobson Pilot at the New England Conservatory and earned a master's degree in harp performance. In 2005, she was awarded the Artist's Diploma as the first ever harpist by the conservatory.

== Orchestra and Ensembles ==
Franziska Huhn has participated in many orchestras and festivals including Gustav Mahler Youth Orchestra, the Pacific Music Festival in Japan and the Tanglewood Music Center in Lenox, Massachusetts. A Fromm Player since 2003, she returned to Tanglewood to perform contemporary music. Huhn is also active in and around the Boston area performing as a substitute harpist with the Boston Symphony Orchestra and playing regularly with chamber music ensembles such as the Walden Chamber Players, the Callithumpian Consort, and Sound Icon. Her reputation for contemporary music is such that composers such as Lior Navok have composed pieces for her to perform.

She has given numerous solo recitals throughout the United States as well as in Lithuania, Norway, Poland, Turkey, Georgia, Russia, Syria, Pakistan and Germany. She was featured in a recital on WGBH in "Live from Studio 1." In 2007, her album Harp Solo was released.

== Teaching ==
Since 2003, Huhn has been the Assistant Director of the Harp Seminar at Boston University Tanglewood Institute. In 2012, she joined the faculty of the summer camp Connecticut Valley Harp Intensive. Huhn serves as harp faculty at the New England Conservatory, directs the Harp Department at the Longy School of Music in Cambridge, Massachusetts, and recently joined the faculty at Boston University College of Fine Arts.
