= Franziska Ehmcke =

German professor of Japanese studies

Franziska Ehmcke (born 1947) was a professor of Japanese Studies at the University of Cologne and recipient of the Japanese order "Order of the Rising Sun." She has been emeritus professor since 2015.

== Personal life ==
Franziska Ehmcke was born in Hamburg in 1947.

== Education ==
Ehmcke studied Japanese Studies, Sinology, and General and Comparative Linguistics at the University of Hamburg. She was awarded a DAAD doctoral scholarship at Tôhoku University in Sendai and in 1978 received her Doctorate in Japanese Studies at the University of Hamburg.

== Career ==
Ehmcke was a Research Assistant in the East Asian Faculty of the University of Cologne from 1978 to 1986, later working as a freelance translator and author between 1986 and 1993. She was Professor and Head of the Department of Japanese Studies at the University of Cologne from 1994 to 2012, and member of the board of the Center for Asian Studies. On June 14, 2013, Ehmcke was awarded the Japanese order "Order of the Rising Sun for her cooperation with other institutions and projects in Japan, promotion of Japan outside of academia, and impact on German-Japanese relations, having established the first taught degree program in Japanese at the University of Cologne, which trained Japanese schoolteachers.

Ehmcke's publications include Der japanische Tee-Weg – Bewusstseinsschulung und Gesamtkunstwerk (Cologne, 1991) and Osaka zu byobu – Ansichten der Burgstadt Osaka in Schloss Eggenberg (Graz, 2010).
