= Politics of Saxony-Anhalt =

Overview of the politics of Saxony-Anhalt

The politics of the German state of Saxony-Anhalt take place within a framework of a federal parliamentary representative democratic republic, where the Federal Government of Germany exercises sovereign rights with certain powers reserved to the states of Germany including Saxony-Anhalt. Before the 2026 Saxony-Anhalt state election, the three main parties are the centre-right Christian Democratic Union, the far-right Alternative for Germany (AfD), and the left-wing Left Party.

Every five years, all Germans residing in the state over the age of 18 elect the members of the Landtag of Saxony-Anhalt. This regional parliament or legislature then elects the minister-president and confirms the cabinet members.

The Christian Democratic Union (CDU) was the largest party in every election from 2002 Saxony-Anhalt state election until the 2026 Saxony-Anhalt state election when the Alternative for Germany (AfD) overtook them.

== List of minister-presidents of Saxony-Anhalt ==
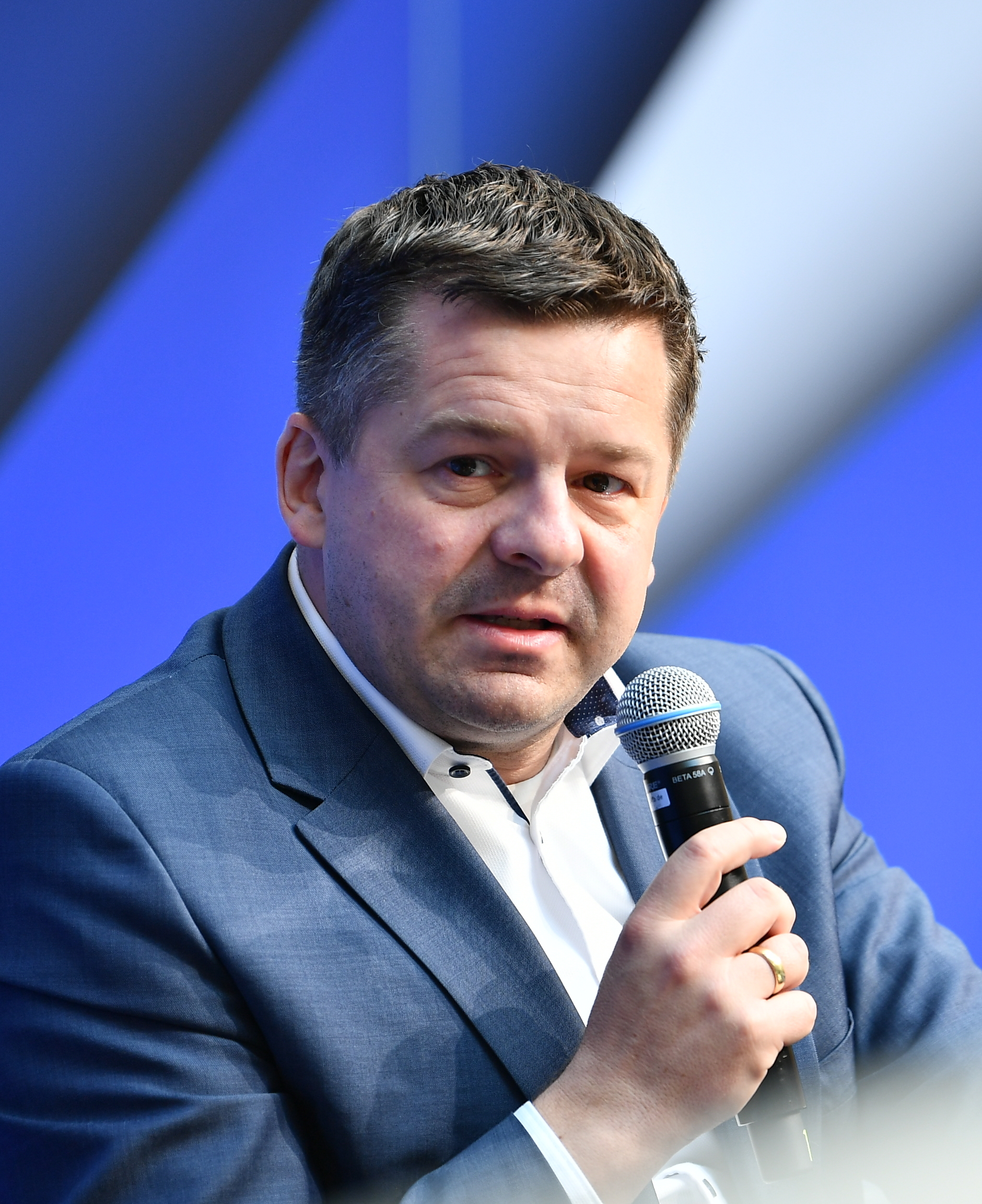
Sven Schulze, incumbent minister-president

1. 1990 - 1991: Gerd Gies (CDU)
2. 1991 - 1993: Werner Münch (CDU)
3. 1993 - 1994: Christoph Bergner (CDU)
4. 1994 - 2002: Reinhard Höppner (SPD)
5. 2002 - 2011: Wolfgang Böhmer (CDU)
6. 2011 - 2026: Reiner Haseloff (CDU)
7. Since 2026 - Sven Schulze (CDU)

== Landtag of Saxony-Anhalt ==
=== Party strength in the Landtag ===
Election year	Total seats	Seats won							
Election year	Total seats	CDU	SPD	PDS	FDP	Grüne	DVU	Linke	AfD
1990	106	48	27	12	14	5			
1994	99	37	36	21		5			
1998	116	28	47	25			16		
2002	115	48	25	25	17				
2006	97	40	24		7			26	
2011	105	41	26			9		29	
2016	87	30	11			5		16	25
2021	97	40	9		7	6		12	23
2026	83	15	8			8		8	39

=== Legislative compositions ===
1990 Saxony-Anhalt state election

1994 Saxony-Anhalt state election

1998 Saxony-Anhalt state election

2002 Saxony-Anhalt state election

2006 Saxony-Anhalt state election

2011 Saxony-Anhalt state election

2016 Saxony-Anhalt state election

2021 Saxony-Anhalt state election

2026 Saxony-Anhalt state election

=== State election results maps ===
1990 Saxony-Anhalt state election, Black is CDU, Red is SPD

1994 Saxony-Anhalt state election, Black is CDU, Red is SPD, Pink is PDS

1998 Saxony-Anhalt state election, Red is SPD, Black is CDU

2002 Saxony-Anhalt state election, Black is CDU, Red is SPD

2006 Saxony-Anhalt state election, Black is CDU, Pink is Linke, Red is SPD

2011 Saxony-Anhalt state election, Black is CDU, Pink is Linke, Red is SPD

2016 Saxony-Anhalt state election, Red is SPD, Black is CDU, AfD is Blue, Pink is Linke

2021 Saxony-Anhalt state election, Black is CDU, AfD is Blue

2026 Saxony-Anhalt state election, AfD is Blue, Pink is Linke

=== Constituencies in the Landtag ===
- Salzwedel (01)
- Gardelegen-Klötze (02)
- Havelberg-Osterburg (03)
- Stendal (04)
- Genthin (05)
- Burg (06)
- Haldensleben (07)
- Wolmirstedt (08)
- Oschersleben-Wanzleben (09)
- Magdeburg I (10)
- Magdeburg II (11)
- Magdeburg III (12)
- Magdeburg IV (13)
- Halberstadt (14)
- Blankenburg (15)
- Wernigerode (16)
- Quedlinburg (17)
- Aschersleben (18)
- Staßfurt (19)
- Schönebeck (20)
- Bernburg (21)
- Köthen (22)
- Zerbst (23)
- Wittenberg (24)
- Jessen (25)
- Dessau-Roßlau (26)
- Dessau-Roßlau-Wittenberg (27)
- Bitterfeld-Wolfen (28)
- Saalekreis (29)
- Eisleben (30)
- Sangerhausen (31)
- Querfurt (32)
- Merseburg (33)
- Bad Dürrenberg-Saalekreis (34)
- Halle I (35)
- Halle II (36)
- Halle III (37)
- Halle IV (38)
- Weißenfels (39)
- Naumburg (40)
- Zeitz (41)

== Constituencies in the Bundestag ==
No	Constituency	Member	2021	Voters	2017	2013	2009	2005	2002	1998	1994	1990
66	Altmark – Jerichower Land	Herbert Wollmann	SPD	159,998	CDU	CDU	Left	SPD	SPD	SPD	SPD	CDU
67	Börde – Salzlandkreis	Franziska Kersten	SPD	215,532	CDU	CDU	CDU	Created for 2009 election				
68	Harz	Heike Brehmer	CDU	207,942	CDU	CDU	CDU	SPD	SPD	SPD	CDU	CDU
69	Magdeburg	Martin Kröber	SPD	229,198	CDU	CDU	Left	SPD	SPD	SPD	SPD	CDU
70	Anhalt – Dessau – Wittenberg	Sepp Müller	CDU	169,749	CDU	CDU	CDU	Created for 2009 election				
71	Halle	Karamba Diaby	SPD	209,765	CDU	CDU	Left	SPD	SPD	SPD	SPD	FDP
72	Burgenland – Saalekreis	Dieter Stier	CDU	184,352	CDU	CDU	CDU	SPD	SPD	SPD	CDU	CDU
73	Mansfeld	Robert Farle	AfD	198,676	CDU	CDU	Left	SPD	SPD	SPD	CDU	CDU

=== Bundestag election results ===
Election year	% won	% won								
Election year	% won	CDU	SPD	PDS	FDP	Grüne	NDP	Linke	AfD	BSW
1990	100	38.6	24.7	9.4	19.7	5.3				
1994	100	38.8	33.4	18.0	4.1	3.6				
1998	100	27.2	38.1	20.7	4.1	3.3				
2002	100	29.0	43.2	14.4	7.6	3.4				
2005	100	24.7	32.7		8.1	4.1	2.6	26.6		
2009	100	30.1	16.9		10.3	5.1		32.4		
2013	100	41.2	18.2		2.6	4.0		23.9	4.2	
2017	100	30.3	15.2		7.8	3.7		17.8	19.6	
2021	100	21.0	25.4		9.5	6.5		9.6	19.6	
2025	100	19.2	11.0		3.1	4.4		10.8	37.1	11.2

== See also ==
- Landtag of Saxony-Anhalt
- 1990 Saxony-Anhalt state election
- 1994 Saxony-Anhalt state election
- 1998 Saxony-Anhalt state election
- 2002 Saxony-Anhalt state election
- 2006 Saxony-Anhalt state election
- 2011 Saxony-Anhalt state election
- 2016 Saxony-Anhalt state election
- 2021 Saxony-Anhalt state election
- 2026 Saxony-Anhalt state election
- New states of Germany
- Politics of East Germany
