= Wolfgang Rauls =

German politician (born 1948)

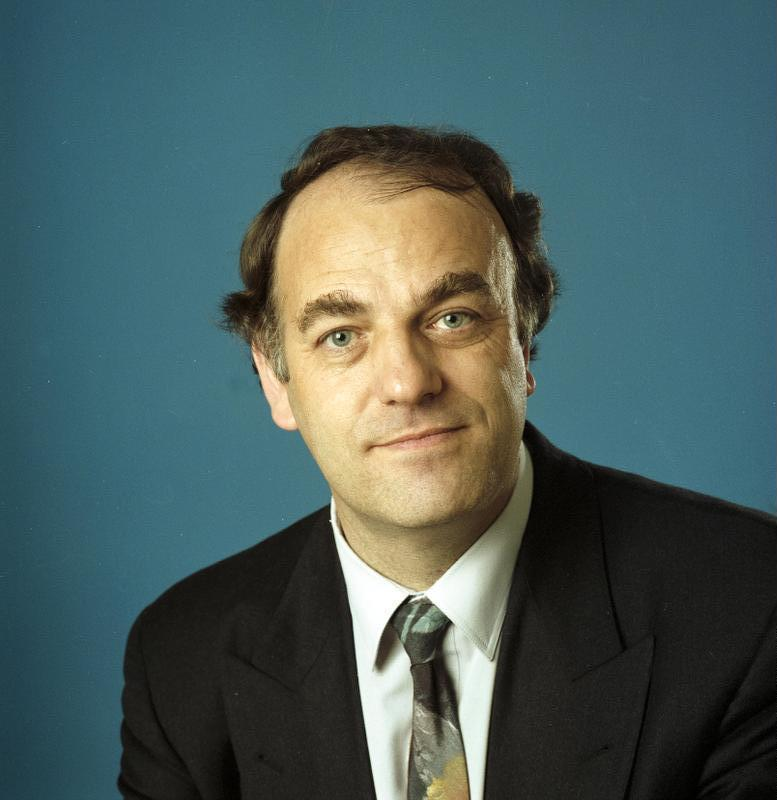
- Rauls in 1991

Leader of the National Democratic Party
- In office 11 February 1990 – 27 March 1990
- Preceded by: Wolfgang Glaeser
- Succeeded by: Position abolished Jürgen Schmieder (as Leader of the Association of Free Democrats)

Mayor of Gommern
- In office 31 December 2005 – 30 June 2012
- Deputy: Annette Schulze
- Preceded by: Klaus Petersen
- Succeeded by: Jens Hünerbein

Minister-President of Saxony-Anhalt
- Acting
- In office 28 November 1993 – 2 December 1993
- Deputy: himself
- Preceded by: Werner Münch
- Succeeded by: Christoph Bergner

Deputy Minister-President of Saxony-Anhalt
- In office 12 September 1991 – 21 July 1994
- Minister-President: Werner Münch; Christoph Bergner
- Preceded by: Gerd Brunner
- Succeeded by: Heidrun Heidecke

Minister for the Environment and Nature Conservation of Saxony-Anhalt
- In office 2 November 1990 – 21 July 1994
- Minister-President: Gerd Gies; Werner Münch; Christoph Bergner
- Preceded by: Position established
- Succeeded by: Heidrun Heidecke (Environment, Nature Conservation and Regional Planning)
Parliamentary constituencies
Member of the Landtag of Saxony-Anhalt
In office 16 May 2002 – 1 January 2006
Preceded by	multi-member district
Succeeded by	Uwe Droese
Constituency	Free Democratic Party List
In office 28 October 1990 – 21 July 1994
Preceded by	Constituency established
Succeeded by	multi-member district
Constituency	Free Democratic Party List

Personal details
- Born: Wolfgang Rauls; 17 June 1948 Rohrsheim, Province of Saxony-Anhalt, Soviet occupation zone (now Germany)
- Died: 19 June 2023 (aged 75)
- Party: Free Democratic Party (1990–)
- Other political affiliations: Association of Free Democrats (1990); National Democratic Party (GDR) (1968–1990)
- Education: Akademie für Staats- und Rechtswissenschaft der DDR
- Occupation: Politician; civil servant; party clerk; Electrician

Wolfgang Rauls (17 June 1948 – 19 June 2023) was a German politician of the Free Democratic Party (FDP). He was the last leader of the National Democratic Party during the Wende, before its eventual merger into the Free Democratic Party. After German reunification, he entered state politics in Saxony-Anhalt, serving as Minister for the Environment and, eventually, Deputy Minister-President in the CDU cabinets from 1990 to 1994.

== Political career ==
=== East Germany ===
In 1968 Rauls, an electrician by trade, joined the National Democratic Party, a Bloc party subservient to the ruling Socialist Unity Party. He thereafter worked as a full-time party official and civil servant in the Bezirk Magdeburg.

During the Peaceful Revolution, Rauls was elected leader of the National Democratic Party and was their lead candidate in the 1990 Volkskammer election. The NDPD now was independent and running on a classical liberal platform of a Social market economy, a phased plan to German reunification and entry of the GDR in the European Community. However, because the NDPD had been reluctant to criticise the SED government even during the Peaceful Revolution and was stained as a former Bloc party, it was initially barred from joining the Association of Free Democrats liberal coalition and fared poorly in the election. With 44,292 votes (0.38%) they received fewer votes than they (nominally) had members. The two elected members of the Volkskammer, none of them being Rauls, joined The Liberals group and the NDPD eventually merged with the Association of Free Democrats, then the Free Democratic Party. Rauls was elected to the Federal Executive Board of the party at the same time.

=== Saxony-Anhalt state politics ===
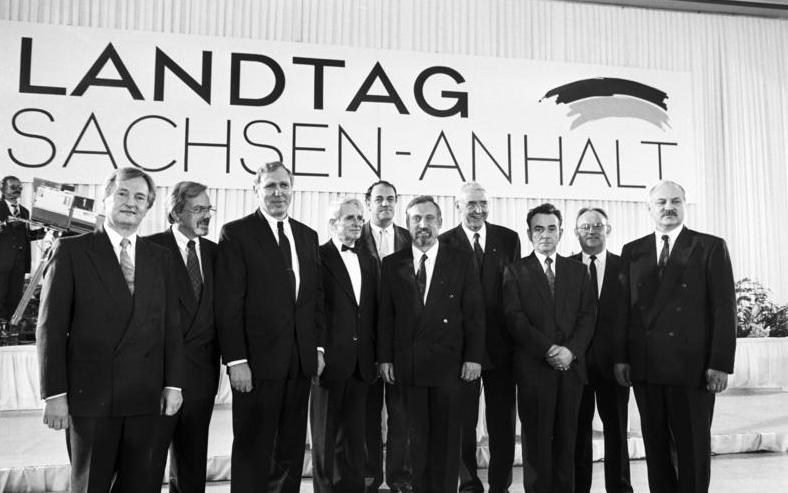
Rauls (center) among the other ministers of the coalition government of Gerd Gies.

After German reunification, Rauls entered state politics in Saxony-Anhalt, where he became Minister for the Environment and Nature Conservation in a coalition government with the CDU under Minister-President Gerd Gies, after winning election to the Landtag in the inaugural October 1990 state election. Under Werner Münch, he was additionally appointed Deputy Minister-President after Gerd Brunner, then also FDP leader Saxony-Anhalt, was exposed as having worked for the Stasi.

In the 1994 election, the coalition government lost re-election, with the FDP under lead candidate Peter Kunert being shut out of the Landtag of Saxony-Anhalt entirely. In January of that year, Rauls had unsuccessfully tried to topple Kunert from his leadership position of the FDP in Saxony-Anhalt. There were quarrels about the direction of the party, with left-leaning Kunert favoring a coalition with SPD and the Greens instead of the CDU.

Rauls later was elected to the Landtag again in the 2002 election, but he was not among the FDP cabinet ministers. Rauls resigned from the Landtag in January 2006, having been elected Mayor of Gommern, a position he retired from in 2012.
