= Black-yellow coalition =

German political coalition

Logo of the CDU

Logo of the FDP

In Germany, a black-yellow coalition (German: schwarz-gelben Koalition) (short black-yellow; also called conservative-liberal, Christian-liberal, center-right or bourgeois coalition) is a coalition between the Union (CDU/ CSU, party colour black) and the FDP (party color yellow).

The term "black-yellow coalition" was unknown before 1972, as the FDP only adopted the color combination yellow/blue during the 1972 state election campaign in Baden-Württemberg.

== Coalitions at the federal level ==
There were black-yellow coalitions at the federal level:

- 1961–1963 under Konrad Adenauer (also Cabinet Adenauer IV and V)
- 1963–1966 under Ludwig Erhard (including Erhard Cabinet I and II)
- 1982–1998 under Helmut Kohl (also Cabinet Kohl I, II, III, IV and V)
- 2009–2013 under Angela Merkel (also Cabinet Merkel II)

From 1949 to 1956, the FDP also participated in federal governments with the CDU/CSU under Konrad Adenauer. However, the German Party and, from 1953 to 1956, the BHE were also part of the government , so these were not purely Christian Democratic (CDU) and Free Democratic (FDP) governments.

== Coalitions at the state level ==
From 27 June 2017 to 28 June 2022, a black-yellow coalition governed North Rhine-Westphalia under Minister-Presidents Armin Laschet and Hendrik Wüst (both CDU). This was the first black-yellow coalition at the state level since 2014. Currently, there is no black-yellow coalition at the state level, although a majority would be mathematically possible in Schleswig-Holstein (where the black-green coalition governs).

=== Baden-Württemberg ===
- 1960–1966 Kurt Georg Kiesinger
- 1996–2005 Erwin Teufel
- 2005–2010 Günther Oettinger
- 2010–2011 Stefan Mappus

=== Bavaria ===
- 2008–2013 Horst Seehofer

=== Berlin ===
- 1953–1955 Walther Schreiber
- 1983–1984 Richard von Weizsäcker
- 1984–1989 Eberhard Diepgen

=== Hesse ===
- 1987–1991 Walter Wallmann
- 1999–2003 Roland Koch
- 2009–2010 Roland Koch
- 2010–2014 Volker Bouffier

=== Mecklenburg-Vorpommern ===
- 1990–1992 Alfred Gomolka
- 1992–1994 Berndt Seite

=== Lower Saxony ===
- 1977–1978 Ernst Albrecht
- 1986–1990 Ernst Albrecht
- 2003–2010 Christian Wulff
- 2010–2013 David McAllister

=== Nordrhein-Westfalen ===
State governments of North Rhine-Westphalia

- 1954–1956 Karl Arnold
- 1962–1966 Franz Meyers
- 2005–2010 Jürgen Rüttgers
- 2017–2021 Armin Laschet
- 2021–2022 Hendrik Wüst

=== Rhineland-Palatinate ===
- 1951–1969 Peter Altmeier
- 1969–1971 Helmut Kohl
- 1987–1988 Bernhard Vogel
- 1988–1991 Carl-Ludwig Wagner

=== Saarland ===
- 1961–1970 Franz-Josef Röder
- 1977–1979 Franz-Josef Röder
- 1979–1985 Werner Zeyer

=== Saxony ===
- 2009–2014 Stanislaw Tillich

=== Saxony-Anhalt ===
- 1990–1991 Gerd Gies
- 1991–1993 Werner Münch
- 1993–1994 Christoph Bergner
- 2002–2006 Wolfgang Böhmer

=== Schleswig-Holstein ===
- 1951–1951 Friedrich Wilhelm Lübke
- 1958–1962 Kai-Uwe von Hassel
- 1963–1971 Helmut Lemke
- 2009–2012 Peter Harry Carstensen

=== Thüringia ===
- 1990–1992 Josef Duchač
- 1992–1994 Bernhard Vogel

== Debate ==
During the television debate between Angela Merkel and Frank-Walter Steinmeier during the 2009 German federal election, Maybrit Illner asked Merkel about her coalition plans – with Illner referring to the black-yellow coalition as the "Tiger Duck Coalition" (German: Tigerentenkoalition) – in reference to the black-and-yellow-striped Janosch character the Tiger Duck. While many media outlets rejected this neologism, it is often used by critics of the coalition because of its mocking undertone.
