= Kumpf =

Kumpf is a German surname with the same etymological roots as the English word "combe". Notable people with the surname include:

- Christian Kumpf (1838–1904), German-born politician in Ontario, Canada. He served as mayor of Waterloo from 1879 to 1880 and from 1888 to 1889
- Henry C. Kumpf (1830–1904), elected to three one-year terms as Mayor of Kansas City, Missouri in 1886–1888
- Henry W. Kumpf (1905–1990), American football player and coach
- Josias Kumpf (1925–2009), Nazi concentration camp guard
- Ronny Kumpf (born 1976), German politician
