= Henry Kumpf =

Henry Kumpf may refer to:

- Henry C. Kumpf (1830–1904), mayor of Kansas City, Missouri
- Henry W. Kumpf (1905–1990), American football coach
