= Christoph Bergner =

German politician (born 1948)

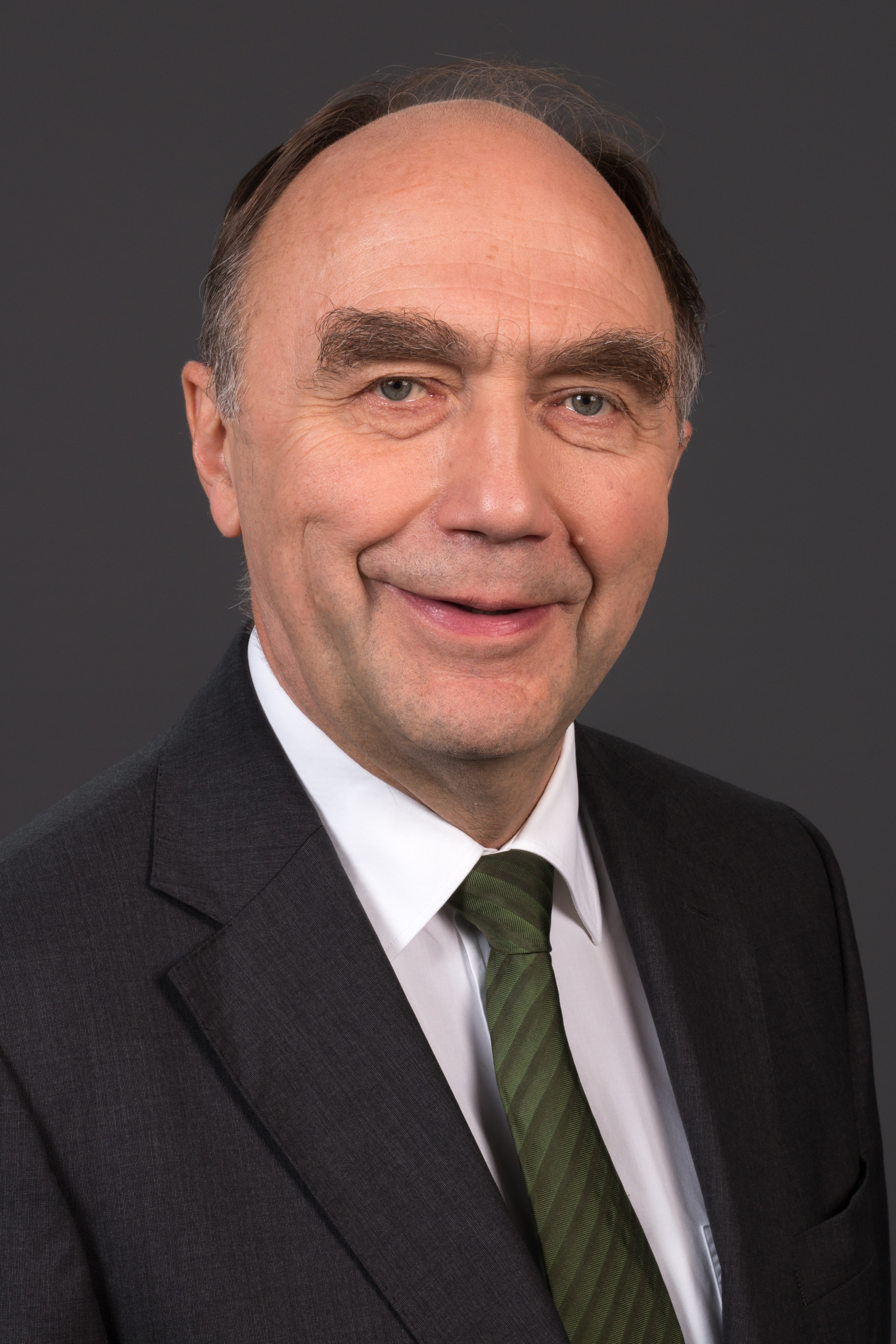
- Bergner in 2014

Minister-President of Saxony-Anhalt
- In office 2 December 1993 – 22 July 1994
- Deputy: Wolfgang Rauls
- Preceded by: Werner Münch
- Succeeded by: Reinhard Höppner

Parliamentary State Secretary in the Ministry of the Interior
- In office 28 October 2009 – 17 December 2013
- Chancellor: Angela Merkel
- Minister: Thomas de Maizière; Hans-Peter Friedrich
- Preceded by: Fritz Rudolf Körper
- Succeeded by: Günter Krings

Leader of the Christian Democratic Union in the Landtag of Saxony-Anhalt
- In office 21 July 1994 – July 2001
- Preceded by: Jürgen Scharf
- Succeeded by: Wolfgang Böhmer
- In office November 1991 – 2 December 1993
- Preceded by: Joachim Auer
- Succeeded by: Jürgen Scharf
Parliamentary constituencies
Member of the Bundestag for Saxony-Anhalt
In office 22 October 2013 – 24 October 2017
Preceded by	Petra Sitte
Succeeded by	Christoph Bernstiel
Constituency	Halle
In office 17 October 2002 – 22 October 2013
Preceded by	multi-member district
Succeeded by	multi-member district
Constituency	Christian Democratic Union Party List
Member of the Landtag of Saxony-Anhalt
In office 25 May 1998 – 16 May 2002
Preceded by	multi-member district
Succeeded by	multi-member district
Constituency	Christian Democratic Union Party List
In office 28 October 1990 – 25 May 1998
Preceded by	Constituency established
Succeeded by	Thomas Felke
Constituency	Halle II

Personal details
- Born: Christoph Georg Bergner; 24 November 1948 (age 77) Zwickau, Saxony, Soviet occupation zone (now Germany)
- Party: Christian Democratic Union (1990–)
- Other political affiliations: Christian Democratic Union (East Germany) (1971–1990)
- Children: 3
- Education: University of Jena; Martin Luther University of Halle-Wittenberg (Dr. agr.)
- Occupation: Politician; Assistant Professor; Cattle Breeder

Christoph Bergner (born 24 November 1948) is a German politician and member of the conservative CDU. Bergner was the third Minister President of Saxony-Anhalt from 1993 until 1994.

== Life and political career ==
Christoph Bergner was born in Zwickau, Sachsen. After finishing his agronomy studies in 1971, he earned a doctorate and worked as a research associate at the Institut für Biochemie der Pflanzen der Akademie der Wissenschaften der DDR from 1974 until 1990.

Bergner was Minister-President of Saxony-Anhalt from 1993 until 1994. Since 2002, he has been a member of the Bundestag; since 2005, a secretary of state in the Federal Ministry of the Interior (Germany); since 2006, he is Federal commissioner for national minorities (German: Beauftragter der Bundesregierung für Aussiedlerfragen und nationale Minderheiten).

Christoph Bergner is a member of the Protestant church and has a critical estimation of Communism. He is married with three children.

== See also ==
- Federal Ministry of the Interior (Germany)
- Cabinet Merkel II
- Framework Convention for the Protection of National Minorities
- European Charter for Regional or Minority Languages
- Volga Germans
- Russian Mennonite
- Deutsche Nationalkreis Asowo
- Deutsche Nationalkreis Halbstadt

Political offices
Preceded by Werner Münch	Minister-President of Saxony-Anhalt; 1993–1994	Succeeded by Reinhard Höppner
