= Wolfgang Böhmer =

German politician (1936–2025)

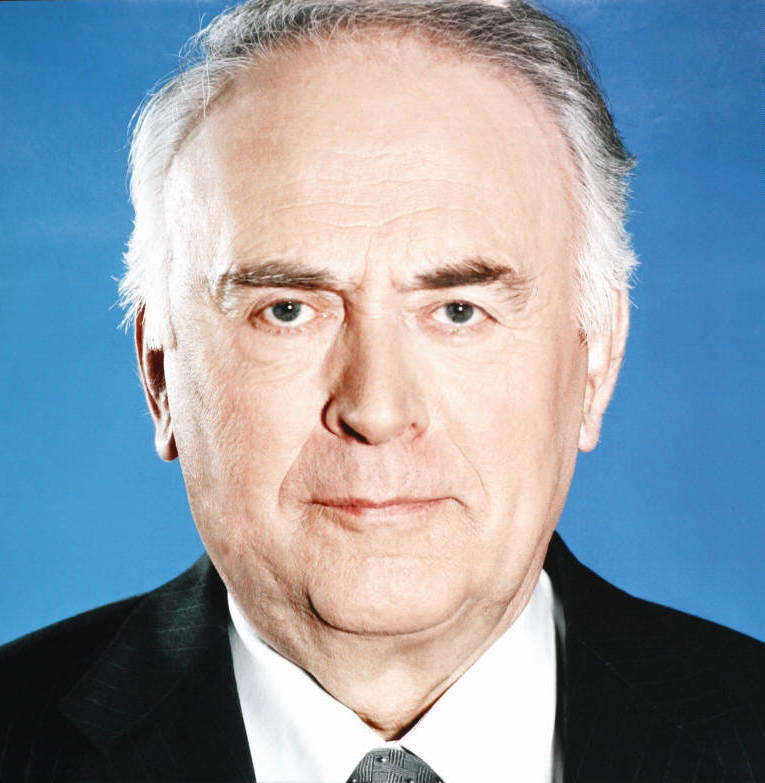
- Böhmer in 2006

Minister-President of Saxony-Anhalt
- In office 16 May 2002 – 19 April 2011
- Deputy: Horst Rehberger; Jens Bullerjahn
- Preceded by: Reinhard Höppner
- Succeeded by: Reiner Haseloff

President of the Bundesrat
- In office 1 November 2002 – 31 October 2003
- First Vice President: Klaus Wowereit
- Preceded by: Klaus Wowereit
- Succeeded by: Dieter Althaus

Leader of the Christian Democratic Union in the Landtag of Saxony-Anhalt
- In office July 2001 – 16 May 2002
- Preceded by: Christoph Bergner
- Succeeded by: Jürgen Scharf
Saxony-Anhalt Cabinet
Minister of Labour and Social Affairs
In office 15 December 1993 – 21 July 1994
Minister-President	Christoph Bergner
Preceded by	Werner Schreiber
Succeeded by	Gerlinde Kuppe (Work, Social Affairs and Health)
Minister of Finance
In office 11 July 1991 – 15 December 1993
Minister-President	Werner Münch
Preceded by	Werner Münch
Succeeded by	Joachim Kupfer
Parliamentary constituencies
Member of the Landtag of Saxony-Anhalt
In office 27 July 2007 – 18 April 2011
Preceded by	Dirk Schatz
Succeeded by	multi-member district
Constituency	Christian Democratic Union Party List
In office 1 July 2005 – 24 April 2006
Preceded by	Gerhard Ruden
Succeeded by	multi-member district
Constituency	Christian Democratic Union Party List
In office 25 May 1998 – 16 May 2002
Preceded by	multi-member district
Succeeded by	multi-member district
Constituency	Christian Democratic Union Party List
In office 28 October 1990 – 25 May 1998
Preceded by	Constituency established
Succeeded by	Helmut Rehhahn
Constituency	Wittenberg

Personal details
- Born: Wolfgang Böhmer; 27 January 1936 Dürrhennersdorf, Gau Saxony, Germany
- Died: 29 June 2025 (aged 89)
- Party: Christian Democratic Union (1990–2025)
- Other political affiliations: Christian Democratic Union (East Germany) (1990)
- Spouse: Brigitte Klein (m. 2004)
- Children: 1
- Education: Leipzig University (Dr. med.); Martin Luther University of Halle-Wittenberg

Wolfgang Böhmer (German: [ˈvɔlfgaŋ ˈbøːmɐ]; 27 January 1936 – 29 June 2025) was a German politician of the Christian Democratic Union (CDU) and was the 5th Minister-President of Saxony-Anhalt from May 2002 to April 2011. He served as President of the Bundesrat in 2002–03. He had formerly worked as a medical doctor.

== Life and career ==
Böhmer was born in Dürrhennersdorf, Saxony, and joined the CDU of East Germany in 1990.

Böhmer publicly spoke out against Angela Merkel and instead endorsed Edmund Stoiber as the party's candidate to challenge incumbent Chancellor Gerhard Schröder in the 2002 federal elections. During his own campaign to unseat incumbent Minister-President Reinhard Höppner of Saxony-Anhalt in the state elections, he focused on economic recovery and received strong backing from Stoiber.

Böhmer was an Honorary Member of The International Raoul Wallenberg Foundation. He died on 29 June 2025, at the age of 89.

== Recognition ==
- 2007 – Order of Merit of the Federal Republic of Germany
- 2015 – Order of Merit of Saxony-Anhalt

Preceded by Reinhard Höppner	Minister-President of Saxony-Anhalt; 2002–2011	Succeeded by Reiner Haseloff
