= Ralf Bergmann =

German politician (1962–2025)

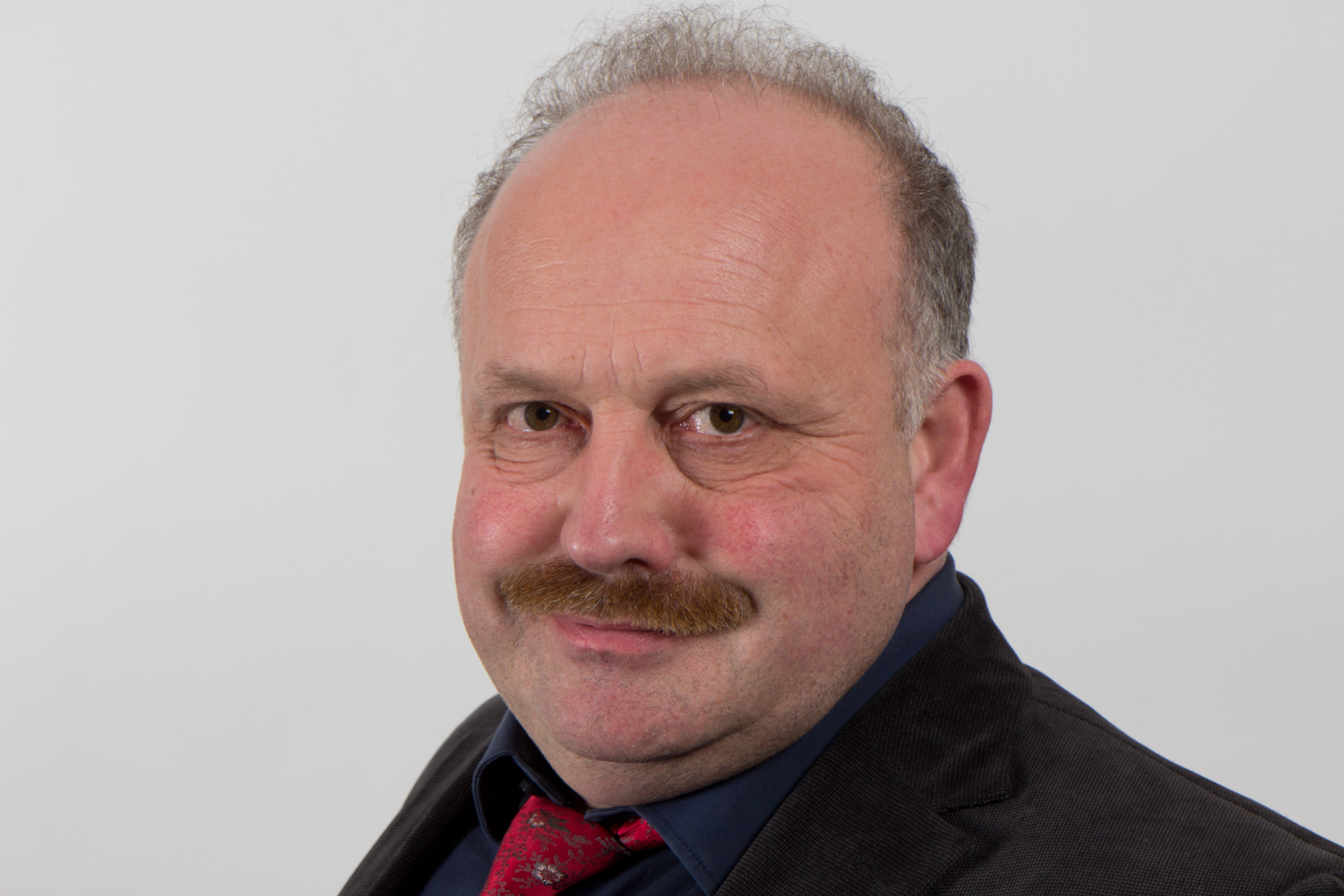
- Bergmann in 2012

Member of the Landtag of Saxony-Anhalt
- In office 24 April 2006 – 12 April 2016
- Constituency: Havelberg-Osterburg (2006–2011); Party list (2011–2016)

Personal details
- Born: Ralf Friedrich Bergmann; 14 April 1962; Dortmund, West Germany
- Died: 25 May 2025 (aged 63)
- Political party: SPD
- Education: Ruhr University Bochum
- Occupation: Academic

Ralf Friedrich Bergmann (14 April 1962 – 25 May 2025) was a German politician. A member of the Social Democratic Party, he served in the Landtag of Saxony-Anhalt from 2006 to 2016.

Bergmann died on 25 May 2025, at the age of 63.
