= 1994 Saxony-Anhalt state election =

German state election

- 26 June 1994

All 99 seats in the Landtag of Saxony-Anhalt 50 seats needed for a majority
- Turnout: 1,134,430 (54.8%) ▼10.3%
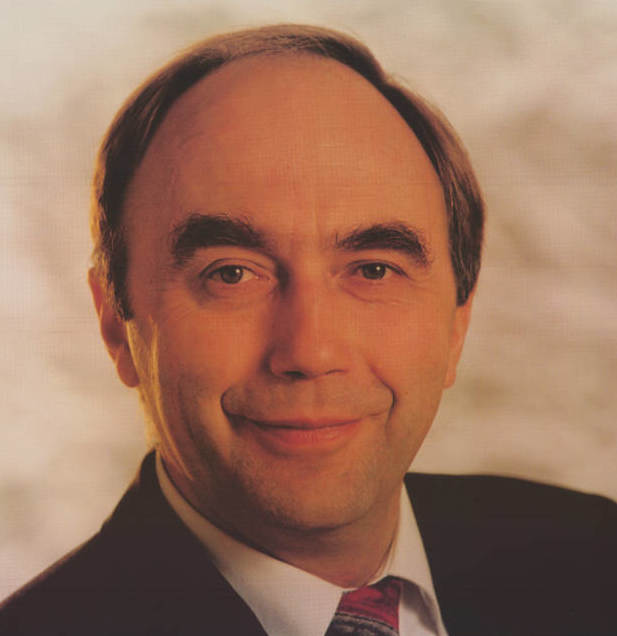

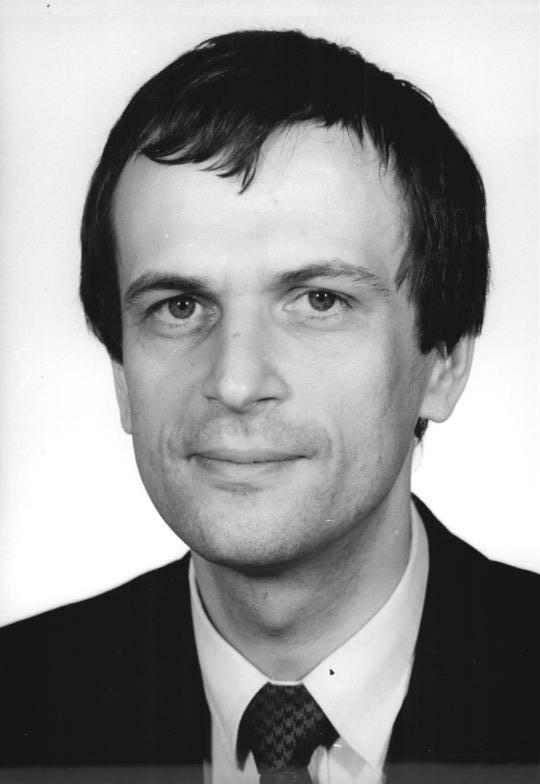

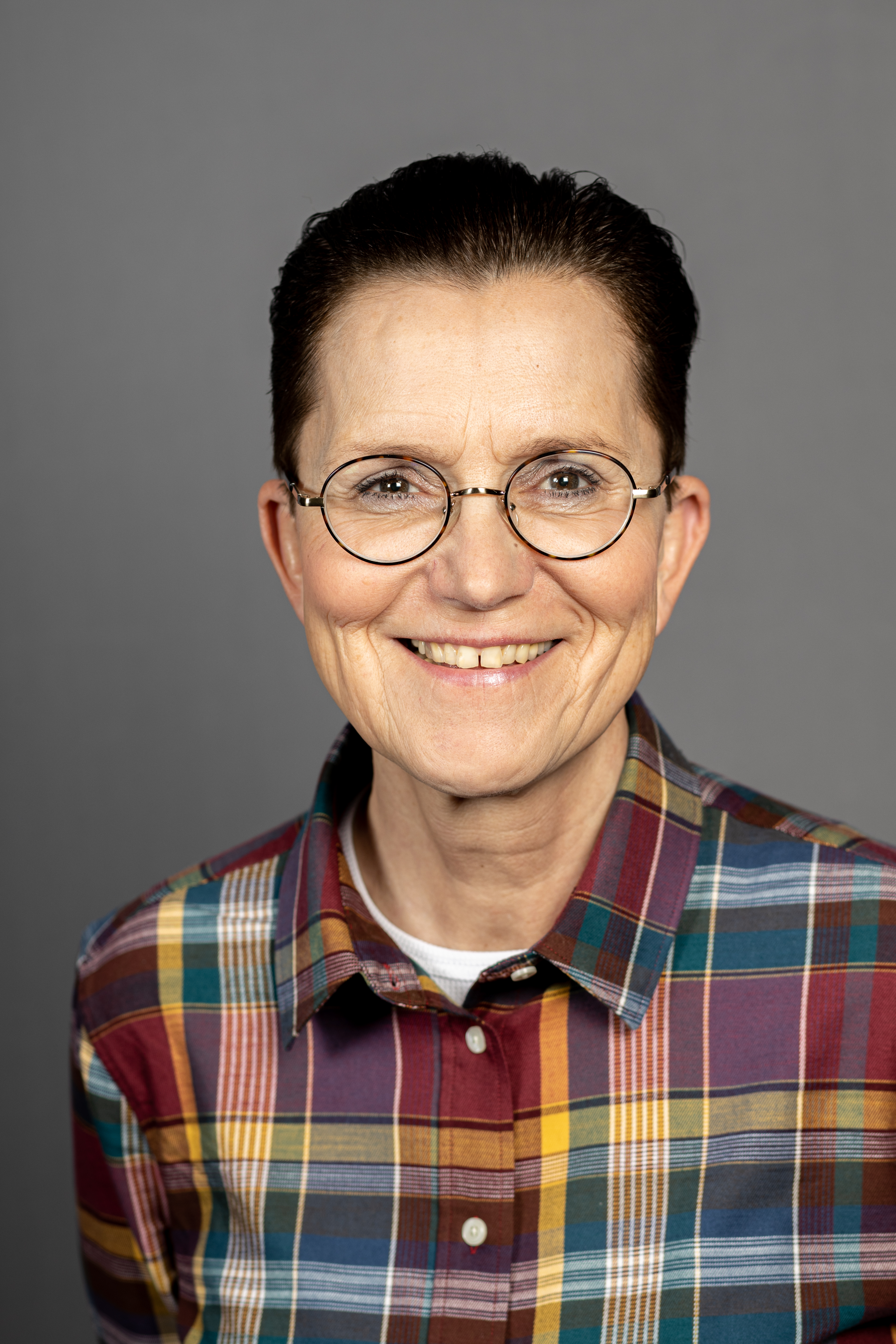
	First party	Second party	Third party
Leader	Christoph Bergner	Reinhard Höppner	Petra Sitte
Party	CDU	SPD	PDS
Last election	48 seats, 39.0%	27 seats, 36.0%	12 seats, 12.0%
Seats won	37	36	21
Seat change	▼11	▲9	▲9
Popular vote	390,077	386,020	225,243
Percentage	34.4%	34.0%	19.9%
Swing	▼4.6%	▲8.0%	▲7.9%
	Fourth party	Fifth party
Leader		Peter Kunert
Party	Greens	FDP
Last election	5 seats, 5.3%	14 seats, 13.5%
Seats won	5	0
Seat change	0	▼14
Popular vote	57,739	40,560
Percentage	5.1%	3.6%
Swing	▼0.2%	▼9.9%
- Results for the single-member constituencies
Minister-President before election
Christoph Bergner
CDU
Elected Minister-President
Reinhard Höppner
SPD

The 1994 Saxony-Anhalt state election was held on 26 June 1994 to elect the members of the 2nd Landtag of Saxony-Anhalt. The incumbent government of the Christian Democratic Union (CDU) and Free Democratic Party (FDP) led by Minister-President Christoph Bergner was defeated. The FDP suffered a 10-point swing and lost its seats in the Landtag, while the CDU narrowly remained the largest party with 34.4% of votes. After the election, the Social Democratic Party (SPD) formed a minority government with The Greens, tolerated by the Party of Democratic Socialism (PDS). This new government became known as the "Magdeburg model".

== Parties ==
The table below lists parties represented in the 1st Landtag of Saxony-Anhalt.

Name		Ideology	Leader(s)	1990 result	
Name		Ideology	Leader(s)	Votes (%)	Seats
CDU	Christian Democratic Union of Germany; Christlich Demokratische Union Deutschlands	Christian democracy	Christoph Bergner	39.0%	48 / 106
SPD	Social Democratic Party of Germany; Sozialdemokratische Partei Deutschlands	Social democracy	Reinhard Höppner	26.0%	27 / 106
FDP	Free Democratic Party; Freie Demokratische Partei	Classical liberalism	Peter Kunert	13.5%	14 / 106
PDS	Party of Democratic Socialism; Partei des Demokratischen Sozialismus	Democratic socialism		12.0%	12 / 106
Grüne	Alliance 90/The Greens; Bündnis 90/Die Grünen	Green politics		5.3%	5 / 106

== Election result ==
Summary of the 26 June 1994 election results for the Landtag of Saxony-Anhalt
Party	Votes	%	+/-	Seats	+/-	Seats %
Christian Democratic Union (CDU)	390,077	34.4	▼4.6	37	▼11	37.4
Social Democratic Party (SPD)	386,020	34.0	▲8.0	36	▲9	36.4
Party of Democratic Socialism (PDS)	225,243	19.9	▲7.9	21	▲9	21.2
Alliance 90/The Greens (Grüne)	57,739	5.1	▼0.2	5	±0	5.1
Free Democratic Party (FDP)	40,560	3.6	▼9.9	0	▼14	0
The Republicans (REP)	15,478	1.4	▲0.8	0	±0	0
Others	19,313	1.7		0	±0	0
Total	1,134,430	100.0		99	▼7	
Voter turnout		54.8	▼10.3			

Popular Vote
CDU	34.39%
SPD	34.03%
PDS	19.86%
GRÜNE	5.09%
FDP	3.58%
Other	3.07%

Landtag seats
CDU	37.37%
SPD	36.36%
PDS	21.21%
GRÜNE	5.05%

== Sources ==
- Landtagswahl 1994
