= Olaf Meister =

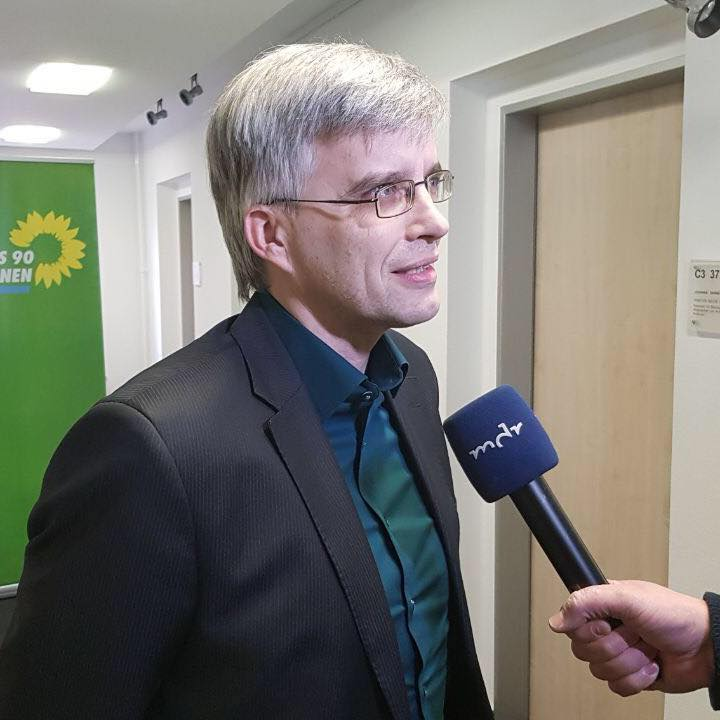
- Meister in 2018

Member of the Landtag of Saxony-Anhalt
- Incumbent
- Assumed office 23 September 2013

Personal details
- Born: 3 March 1971 (age 55) Magdeburg, Bezirk Magdeburg, East Germany

Olaf Meister (born 3 March 1971) is a German politician who is a member of the Landtag of Saxony-Anhalt since 2013. He is a member of the Green Party.
