= Klaus Keitel =

German politician (1939–2026)

President of the Landtag of Saxony-Anhalt
- In office 28 October 1990 – 25 May 1998
- Preceded by: position established
- Succeeded by: Wolfgang Schaefer

Member of the Landtag of Saxony-Anhalt
- In office 29 October 1990 – 16 May 2002

Personal details
- Born: 5 February 1939 Naumburg, Gau Halle-Merseburg, Germany
- Died: 4 January 2026 (aged 86) Halle, Saxony-Anhalt, Germany
- Party: CDU
- Education: Martin Luther University Halle-Wittenberg
- Occupation: Journalist

Klaus Keitel (5 February 1939 – 4 January 2026) was a German politician. A member of the Christian Democratic Union, he served as a member of the Landtag of Saxony-Anhalt from 1990 to 2002 and was its president from 1990 to 1998.

Keitel died in Halle on 4 January 2026, at the age of 86.
