= Karl-Hermann Steinberg =

German chemist and politician (1941–2021)

Landesbevollmächtigter of Saxony-Anhalt
- In office 3 October 1990 – 28 October 1990
- Appointed by: Lothar de Maizière
- Preceded by: Position established
- Succeeded by: Gerd Gies (as Minister-President of Saxony-Anhalt)

Minister of the Environment, Nature Conservation, Energy and Reactor Safety of East Germany
- In office 12 April 1990 – 3 October 1990
- Minister-President: Lothar de Maizière
- Preceded by: Peter Diederich (Environmental Protection and Water Management)
- Succeeded by: Klaus Töpfer (as Minister for the Environment, Nature Conservation, and Reactor Safety)

Member of the Volkskammer for Halle
- In office 14 November 1971 – 5 April 1990
- Preceded by: multi-member district
- Succeeded by: Constituency abolished

Personal details
- Born: 22 June 1941 Heiligenstadt, Thuringia, Nazi Germany (now Germany)
- Died: 17 October 2021 (aged 80)
- Party: Christian Democratic Union (1990–2021)
- Other political affiliations: Christian Democratic Union (East) (1970–1990)
- Education: Technical University Leuna-Merseburg
- Occupation: Politician; University Lecturer; Business Consultant

Karl-Hermann Steinberg (22 June 1941 – 17 October 2021) was an eminent German university lecturer in Chemistry who became a politician (CDU) and briefly, in 1990 a deputy party chairman, and a Government Minister during the final months of the German Democratic Republic.

== Life ==
=== Early years ===
Steinberg was born at the height of the war in what had been a spa town in the south of what was then the central part of Germany. His father was a clerical worker. The war ended shortly before he was four, and the entire region became the Soviet occupation zone in what had formerly been Germany. When he was eight, in October 1949, the establishment of the German Democratic Republic formally put an end to Soviet Military Administration, substituting a stand-alone German state with its constitutional arrangements closely modeled on the Soviet Union and its governing class supported by Moscow. Steinberg successfully concluded his schooling and in 1954 joined the Free German Youth (FDJ / Freie Deutsche Jugend), which was in effect the "youth wing" of the young country's Sozialistische Einheitspartei Deutschlands. Later, in 1959, he joined the Christian Democratic Union which under the constitutional arrangements then in force was one of several bloc parties operated under the control of the SED (party) through an administrative structure called the National Front. In 1964 he also joined the Freier Deutscher Gewerkschaftsbund. Between 1959 and 1964 he studied at the Leuna-Merseburg Technical Academy, graduating with a degree in Chemistry.

=== Academic career ===
Steinberg remained at Leuna from 1964 till 1970, working as a research assistant. He received his doctorate in 1968 for a dissertation on surface science and catalysis (Oberflächenchemie u. Katalyse). From 1971, still at Leuna, he was working as a research lecturer. Between 1974 and 1977 he worked nearby as a research chemist at VEB Leunawerke, originally a BASF plant and after 1949 East Germany's largest chemicals plant. He nevertheless retained his connections with the academic world, achieving his habilitation (a further academic qualification) in 1976. In 1977 he was appointed to a full lectureship. In 1982 he moved to the Karl Marx University of Leipzig (as it was then known) as Professor for Technical Chemistry.

=== Politics ===
Although the German Democratic Republic had been formally founded only in 1949, the basis for a return to one-party government had been established in April 1946, with the contentious merger of the old Communist Party with the Moderate-left SPD. Since 1950 elections had been choreographed to ensure that approximately 99% of the vote went to the ruling SED, but the bloc parties also received a fixed quota of seats in the national legislative assembly Volkskammer, and from 1971 till October 1990 Karl-Hermann Steinberg served as a member of the assembly. He was also, from 1970, a member of the CDU's regional committee for Merseburg and of the party's district committee for Halle.

Nationally, Steinberg became a deputy president of the CDU in December 1989, a month after the breach of the Berlin Wall had set in motion a series of events which would lead to reunification in October 1990. He serve from 1989 as a Deputy Minister for Heavy Industry. After the 1990 election he served from April 1990 as Minister for Protection of the Environment and Nature, for Reactor Safety and for Energy under Lothar de Maizière. His critical responsibilities included decommissioning principal sources of pollution in the old East German chemicals industry and the closure of the Greifswald Nuclear Power Plant. He was also mandated to negotiate with West Germany for an "Environment Union" between the two Germanys. along with gas and electricity power supply agreements. Steinberger's national ministerial responsibilities ended in October 1990 when the agreements covering German reunification ended to the separate East German government.

In October 1990, he briefly served as the interim head of government of the newly re-established state of Saxony-Anhalt until the election of Minister-President Gerd Gies.

=== Science and industry ===
After his period in national politics came to an end Steinberg returned to Leipzig University. Before the end of 1991 he had set himself up as a self-employed business consultant. Soon after this he became Research Director with Preussag AG, and took on a project to develop a technology or system to reduce the high level of CO_{2} emitted by the company. He began work on a system using laboratory-cultured Chlorella (MicroAlgae). Three years later research had progressed to the point at which a pilot project was ready for launch, but now Preussag AG mutated into a Travel and tourism business, which meant that it was no longer interested in the project Steinberg had been conducting for it. Steinberg continued to believe in the technology, however, and established a stand-alone business with the bioreactor technology and himself in charge.

He sought and found support both in the private sector and from the regional government of Saxony-Anhalt, which invited him to establish his business in Klötze, some 20 km to the north-east of Wolfsburg. Early production was not without set-backs, and it became clear that the business would need to be developed with the commercial backing of a larger corporation, as a result of which, in 2008, the business moved in under the corporate roof of Roquette Frères, a privately owned multi-national diversified manufacturing conglomerate with a specialism in starches and products in the medicines, cosmetics and foodstuffs sectors.

== Awards and honours ==
Steinberg's awards and honours have included the Patriotic Order of Merit in Bronze (1985) and the Banner of Labor.
