= Ronny Kumpf =

German politician (born 1976)

Member of the Landtag of Saxony-Anhalt
- Assuming office 6 October 2026
- Succeeding: Andreas Schumann
- Constituency: Magdeburg IV

Personal details
- Born: 14 December 1976 (age 49)
- Party: Alternative for Germany (since 2013)

Ronny Kumpf (born 14 December 1976) is a German politician who was elected member of the Landtag of Saxony-Anhalt in 2026. He has been a city councillor of Magdeburg since 2018.
