= 2011 Saxony-Anhalt state election =

State election in Saxony-Anhalt, Germany

- 20 March 2011

All 105 seats in the Landtag of Saxony-Anhalt 53 seats needed for a majority
- Turnout: 993,502 (51.2%) ▲6.8%
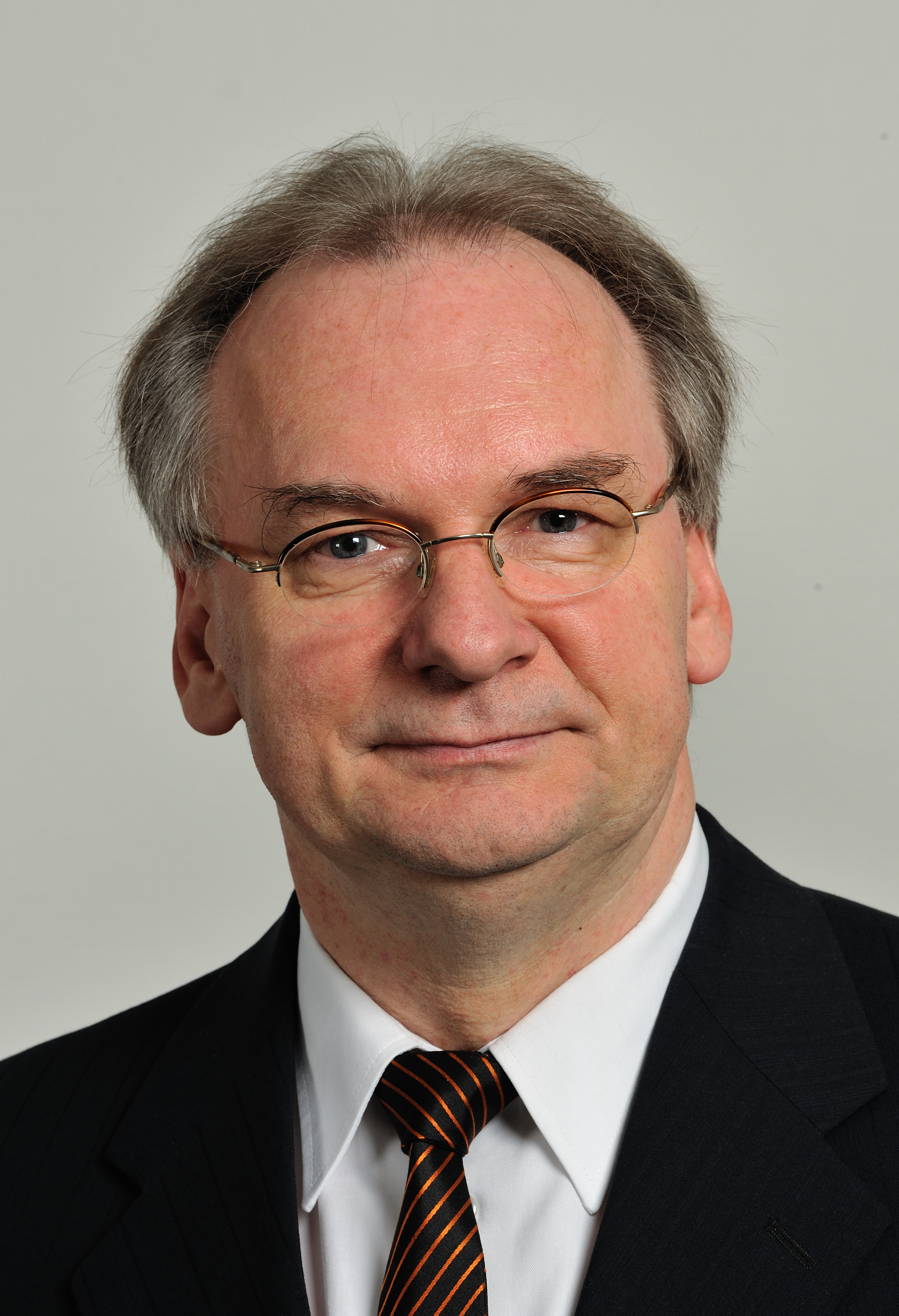

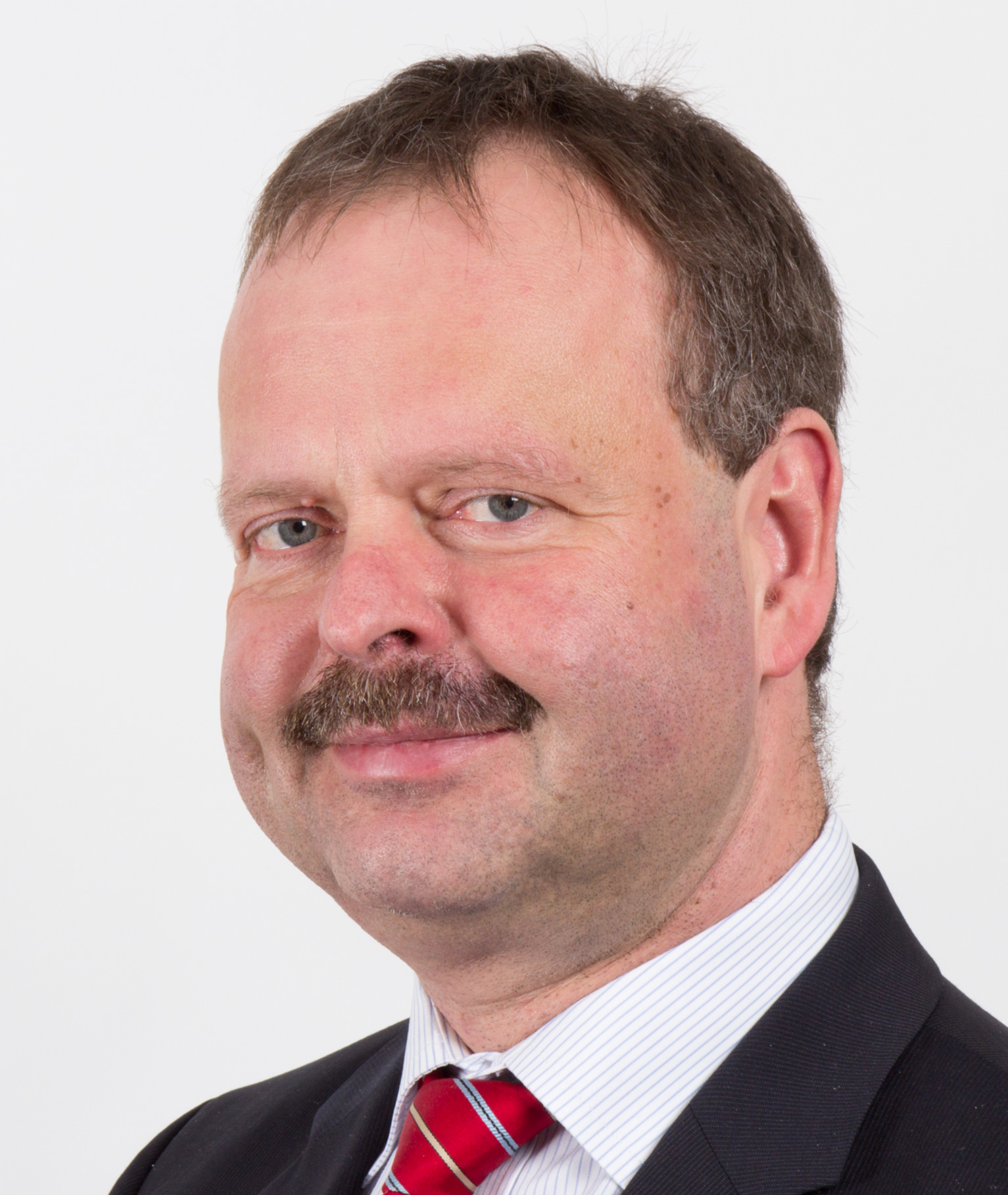

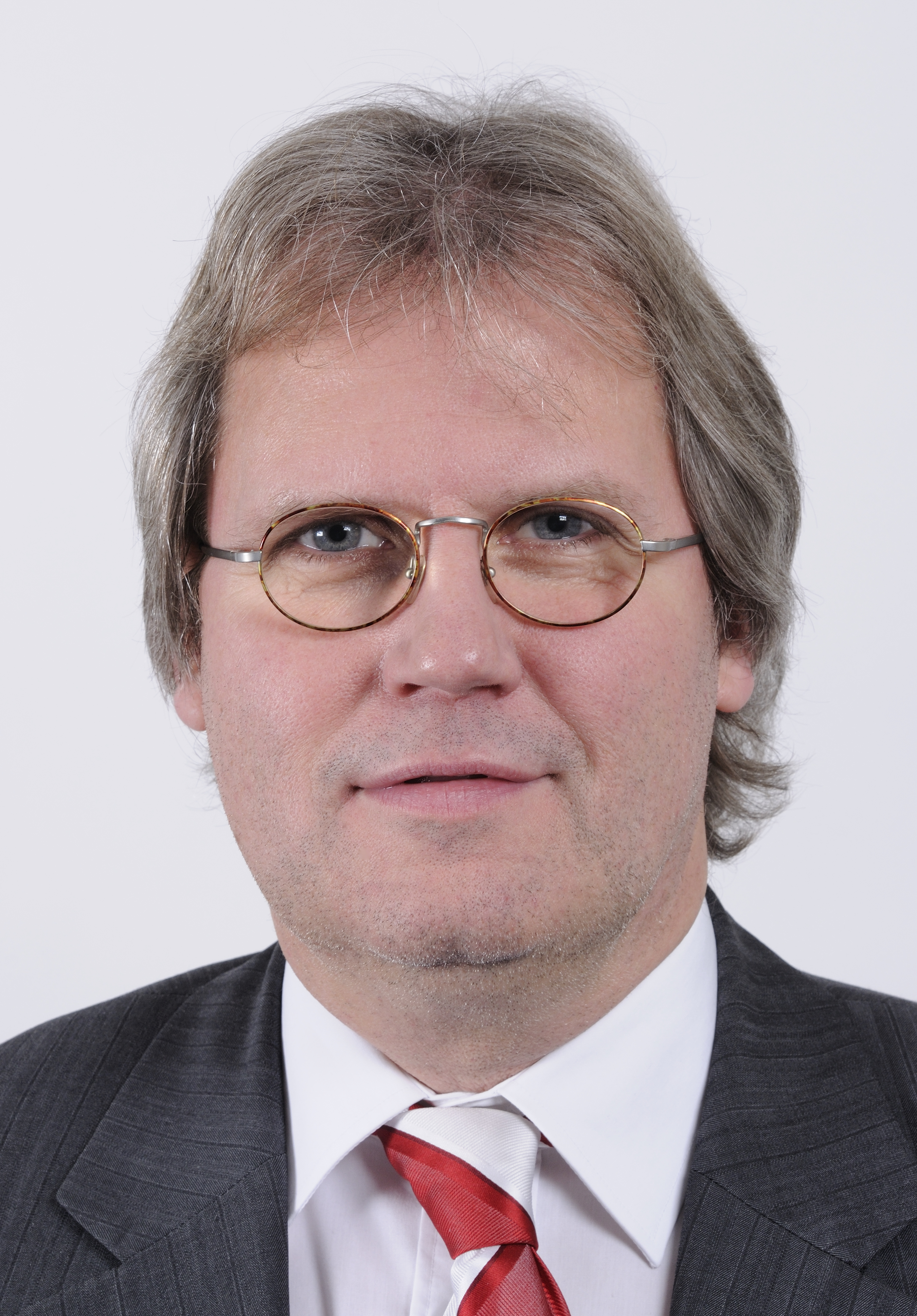

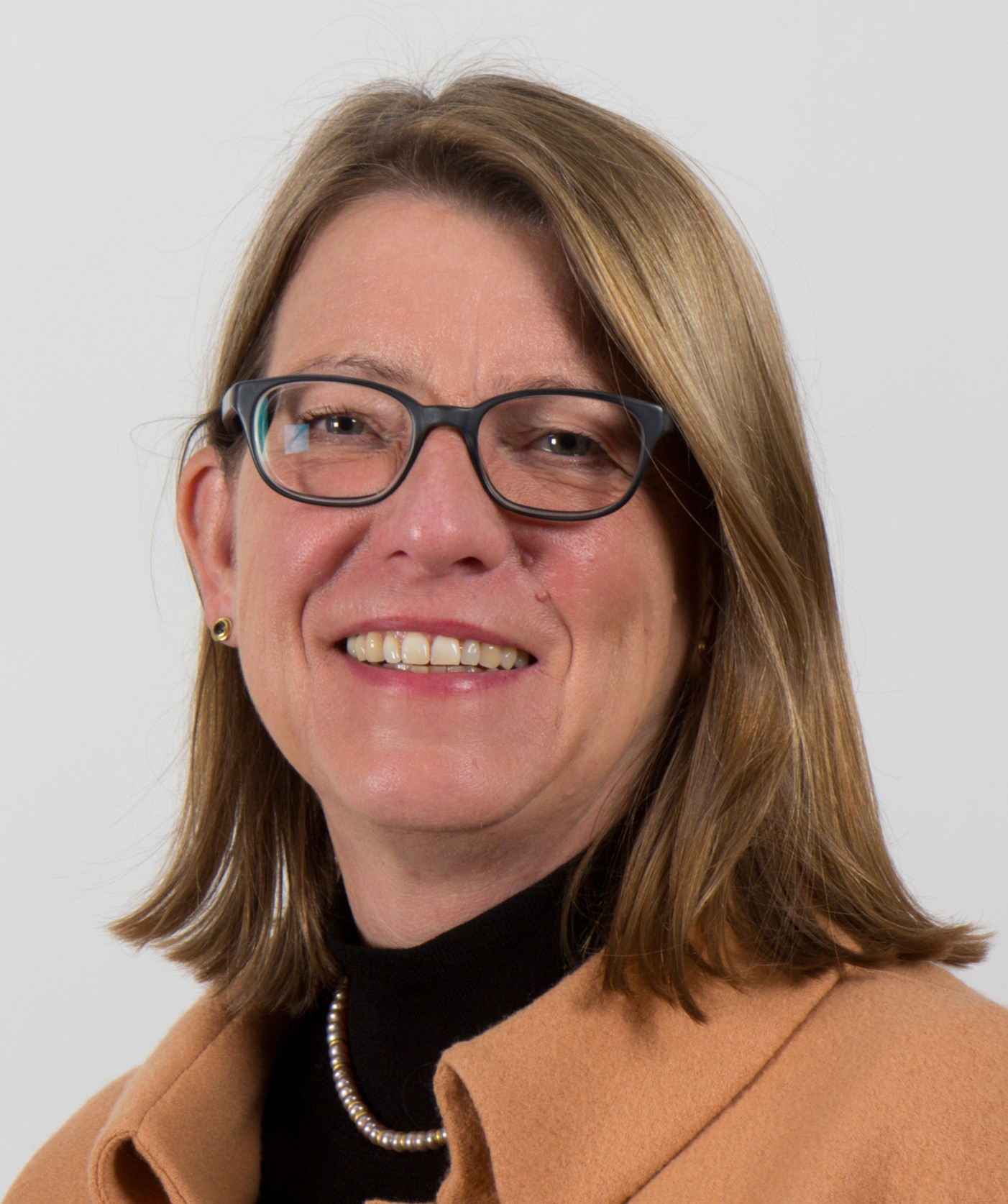
	First party	Second party
Leader	Reiner Haseloff	Wulf Gallert
Party	CDU	Left
Last election	40 seats, 36.2%	26 seats, 24.1%
Seats won	41	29
Seat change	▲1	▲3
Popular vote	323,019	235,011
Percentage	32.5%	23.7%
Swing	▼3.7%	▼0.4%
	Third party	Fourth party
Leader	Jens Bullerjahn	Claudia Dalbert
Party	SPD	Greens
Last election	24 seats, 21.4%	0 seats, 3.6%
Seats won	26	9
Seat change	▲2	▲9
Popular vote	213,611	70,922
Percentage	21.5%	7.1%
Swing	▲0.1%	▲3.5%
- Results for the single-member constituencies
Minister-President before election
Wolfgang Böhmer
CDU
Elected Minister-President
Reiner Haseloff
CDU

The 2011 Saxony-Anhalt state election was held on 20 March 2011 to elect the members of the 6th Landtag of Saxony-Anhalt. The incumbent grand coalition of the Christian Democratic Union (CDU) and Social Democratic Party (SPD) led by Minister-President Wolfgang Böhmer retained its majority and continued in office. Böhmer retired at this election, and his successor Reiner Haseloff was elected as the new Minister-President after the coalition was confirmed.

== Parties ==
The table below lists parties represented in the 5th Landtag of Saxony-Anhalt.

Name		Ideology	Leader(s)	2006 result	
Name		Ideology	Leader(s)	Votes (%)	Seats
CDU	Christian Democratic Union of Germany; Christlich Demokratische Union Deutschlands	Christian democracy	Reiner Haseloff	36.2%	40 / 97
Linke	The Left; Die Linke	Democratic socialism	Wulf Gallert	24.1%	26 / 97
SPD	Social Democratic Party of Germany; Sozialdemokratische Partei Deutschlands	Social democracy	Jens Bullerjahn	21.4%	24 / 97
FDP	Free Democratic Party; Freie Demokratische Partei	Classical liberalism		6.7%	7 / 97

== Opinion polling ==
Polling firm	Fieldwork date	Sample size	CDU	Linke	SPD	FDP	Grüne	NPD	Others	Lead
2011 state election	20 Mar 2011	–	32.5	23.7	21.5	3.8	7.1	4.6	6.7	8.8
Forschungsgruppe Wahlen	8–10 Mar 2011	1,680	32	24	24	5	5	5	5	8
Infratest dimap	8–10 Mar 2011	1,001	33.0	25.0	24.0	4.5	5.5	5.0	3.0	8.0
Emnid	11–17 Feb 2011	1,000	31	27	22	5	7	5	3	4
Infratest dimap	11–15 Feb 2011	1,000	32	26	23	5	7	4	3	6
Infratest dimap	14–18 Jan 2011	1,000	32	28	22	4	8	3	3	4
Infratest dimap	16–20 Sep 2010	1,001	30	30	21	5	9	–	5	Tie
Emnid	4–14 Aug 2010	1,000	30	27	22	5	7	–	9	3
Infratest dimap	11–15 Mar 2010	1,000	34	29	20	8	5	–	4	5
Infratest dimap	8–12 May 2009	1,000	33	25	24	7	6	2	3	8
Infratest dimap	10–12 Apr 2007	1,000	35	25	24	7	4	–	5	10
IWD	7–13 Oct 2006	750	31.2	19.8	28.2	5.6	4.5	–	10.7	3.0
2006 state election	26 Mar 2006	–	36.2	24.1	21.4	6.7	3.6	3.0	5.1	12.1

== Election result ==
Summary of the 20 March 2011 election results for the Landtag of Saxony-Anhalt
Party	Votes	%	+/-	Seats	+/-	Seats %
Christian Democratic Union (CDU)	323,019	32.5	▼3.7	41	▲1	39.0
The Left (Linke)	235,011	23.7	▼0.4	29	▲3	27.6
Social Democratic Party (SPD)	215,611	21.5	▲0.1	26	▲2	24.8
Alliance 90/The Greens (Grüne)	70,922	7.1	▲3.5	9	▲9	8.6
National Democratic Party (NPD)	45,826	4.6	▲1.6 (Note: Compared to results for the DVU, which merged into the NPD in 2010.)	0	±0 (Note: Compared to results for the DVU, which merged into the NPD in 2010.)	0
Free Democratic Party (FDP)	38,173	3.8	▼2.9	0	▼7	0
Free Voters (FW)	28,193	2.8	▲2.3	0	±0	0
Human Environment Animal Protection Party (Tierschutz)	15,724	1.6	▲1.6	0	±0	0
Pirate Party Germany (Piraten)	13,828	1.4	▲1.4	0	±0	0
Others	9,195	0.9		0	±0	0
Total	993,502	100.0		105	▲8	
Voter turnout		51.2	▲6.8			

Popular Vote
CDU	32.51%
DIE LINKE	23.65%
SPD	21.50%
GRÜNE	7.14%
NPD	4.61%
FDP	3.84%
Other	6.74%

Landtag seats
CDU	39.05%
DIE LINKE	27.62%
SPD	24.76%
GRÜNE	8.57%
