= 1994 German federal election =

- 16 October 1994

All 672 seats in the Bundestag 337 seats needed for a majority
- Registered: 60,452,009 ▲0.0%
- Turnout: 47,737,999 (79.0%) ▲1.2 pp
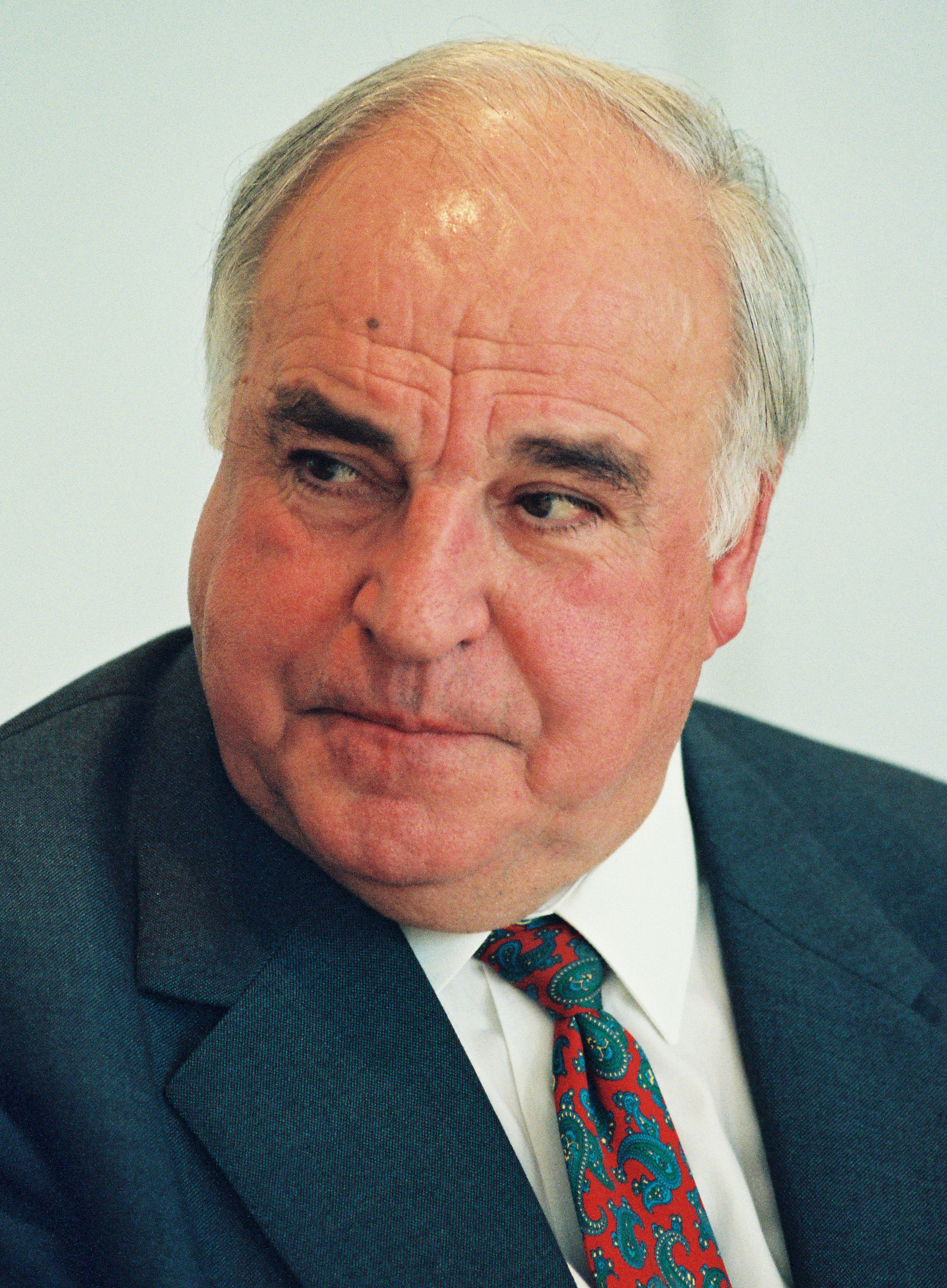

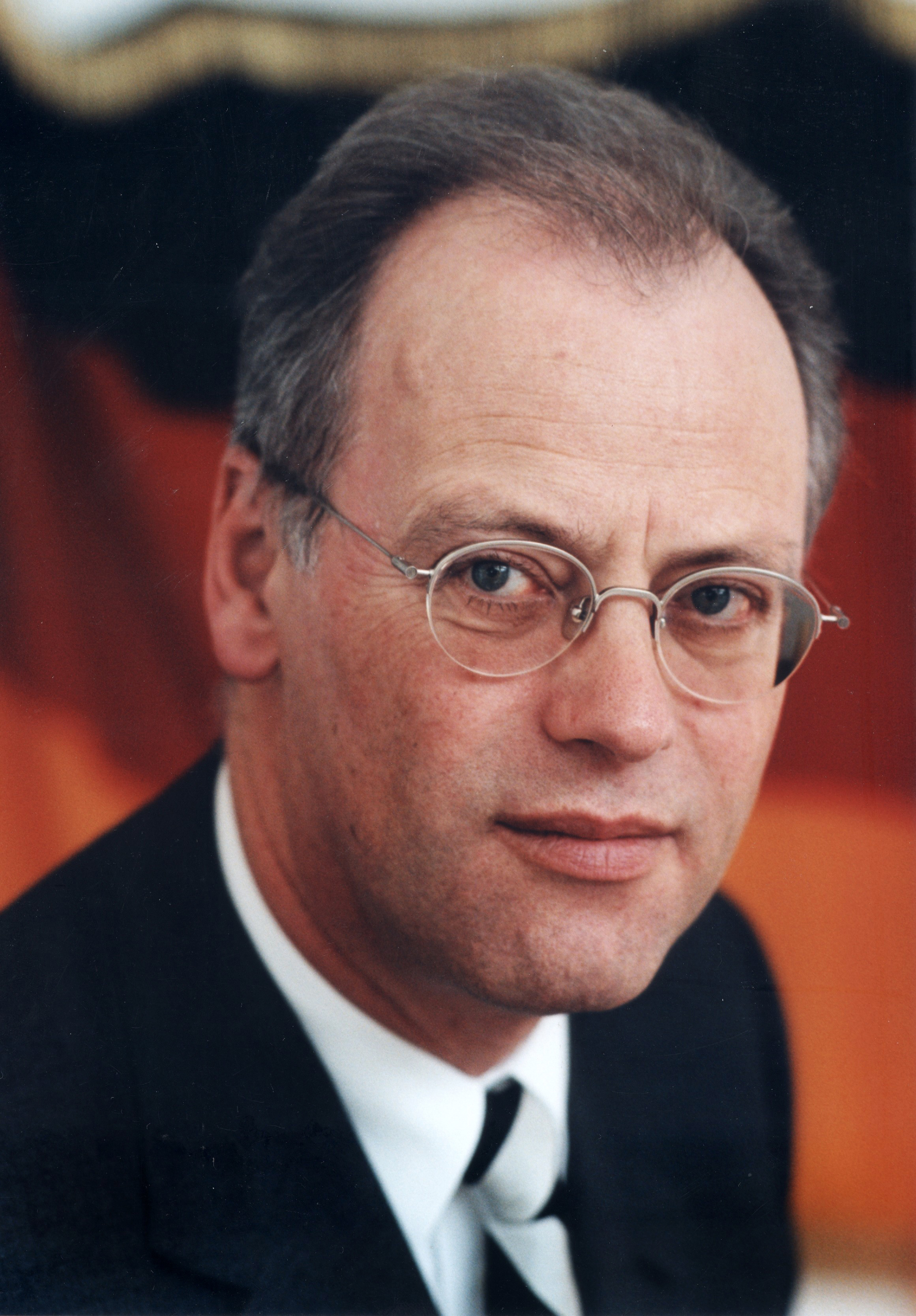

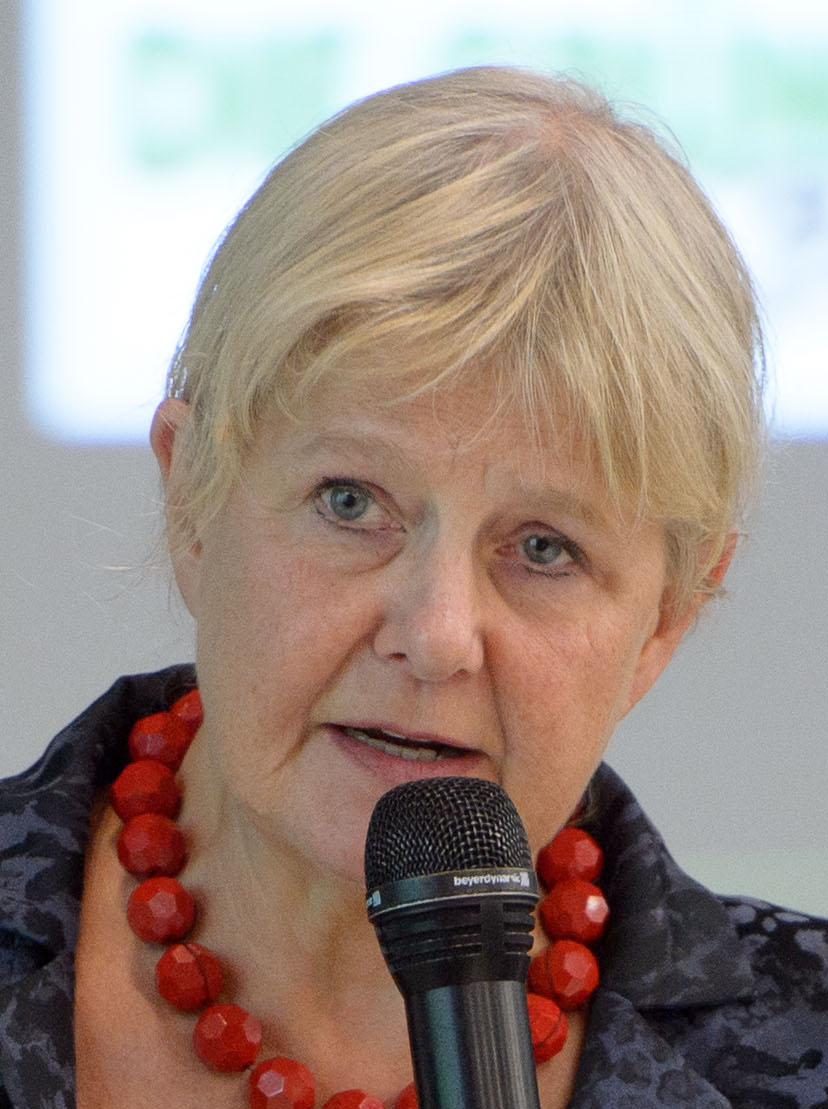

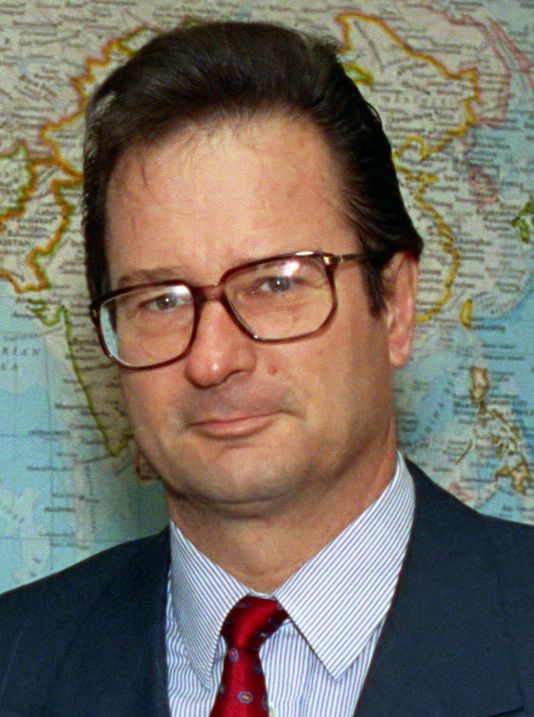

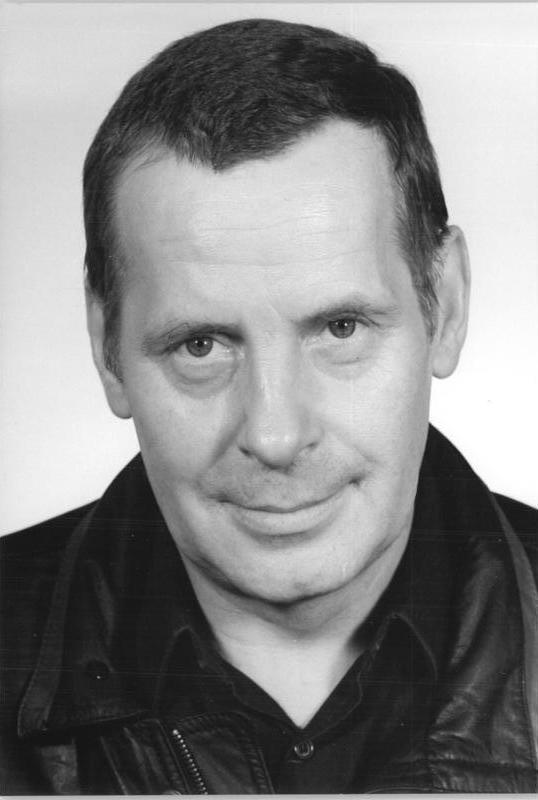
	First party	Second party	Third party
Candidate	Helmut Kohl	Rudolf Scharping	Ludger Volmer & Marianne Birthler
Party	CDU/CSU	SPD	Greens
Last election	43.8%, 319 seats	33.5%, 239 seats	5.1%, 8 seats (Note: Combined results of Alliance 90/Green Citizens' Movements and the West German Green Party.)
Seats won	294	252	49
Seat change	▼25	▲13	▲41
Popular vote	19,517,156	17,140,354	3,424,315
Percentage	41.4%	36.4%	7.3%
Swing	▼2.4 pp	▲2.9 pp	▲2.2 pp
	Fourth party	Fifth party
Candidate	Klaus Kinkel	Lothar Bisky
Party	FDP	PDS
Last election	11.0%, 79 seats	2.4%, 17 seats
Seats won	47	30
Seat change	▼32	▲13
Popular vote	3,258,407	2,066,176
Percentage	6.9%	4.4%
Swing	▼4.1 pp	▲2.0 pp
- Results of the election. The main map shows constituency winners, and results for the proportional list seats are shown in the bottom left.
Government before election
Fourth Kohl cabinet
CDU/CSU-FDP
Government after election
Fifth Kohl cabinet
CDU/CSU-FDP

A federal election was held in Germany on 16 October 1994 to elect the members of the 13th Bundestag. The CDU/CSU alliance led by Helmut Kohl remained the largest faction in parliament, with Kohl remaining Chancellor in a narrowly re-elected coalition with the Free Democratic Party (FDP). This elected Bundestag was the largest in history until 2017, numbering 672 members.

Even though this election did not lead to a switch in government, it saw the election of many people to the Bundestag who would play an important role later. Future CDU leaders Friedrich Merz and Armin Laschet were first elected to the Bundestag in 1994, as were future cabinet ministers Norbert Röttgen and Peter Altmaier. This was the last election until 2009 that a centre-right government was elected.

== Issues and campaign ==
The Social Democratic Party (SPD) let its members elect a candidate for chancellor against Helmut Kohl after SPD leader Björn Engholm and chancellor candidate-designate had to resign in 1993 amid scandal. Rudolf Scharping, Minister-President of Rhineland-Palatinate, beat Gerhard Schröder and Heidemarie Wieczorek-Zeul in the SPD's internal election. Scharping was only elected with 40 percent of the vote and relied on campaigning with other SPD leaders and rivals such as Oskar Lafontaine and Gerhard Schröder, both self-confident and outspoken, in a "troika". Tension between them greatly hurt his campaign. In addition, Scharping was seen as a weak leader due to his lack of charisma and media skills, and therefore did not induce a lot of enthusiasm.

For the first time in their existence, Alliance 90/The Greens seemed to be willing to join a government in case a centre-left SPD–Greens coalition had a workable majority in the Bundestag.

The election also saw a "red socks" campaign used by the centre-right, including the CDU/CSU and the Free Democratic Party (FDP), to scare off a possible red–red–green coalition (SPD–Party of Democratic Socialism (PDS)–Greens). Analysts have stated that such a strategy likely paid off, as it was seen as one of the decisive elements for the narrow victory of Kohl for the CDU/CSU–FDP. The campaign was criticized as an obvious attempt to discredit the whole political left; the PDS reinterpreted it for itself by printing red socks.

== Results ==
Party	Party-list			Constituency			Total seats	+/–
Party	Votes	%	Seats	Votes	%	Seats	Total seats	+/–
Social Democratic Party	17,140,354	36.39	149	17,966,813	38.27	103	252	+13
Christian Democratic Union	16,089,960	34.16	67	17,473,325	37.22	177	244	−24
Christian Social Union	3,427,196	7.28	6	3,657,627	7.79	44	50	−1
Alliance 90/The Greens	3,424,315	7.27	49	3,037,902	6.47	0	49	+41
Free Democratic Party	3,258,407	6.92	47	1,558,185	3.32	0	47	−32
Party of Democratic Socialism	2,066,176	4.39	26	1,920,420	4.09	4	30	+13
The Republicans	875,239	1.86	0	787,757	1.68	0	0	0
The Grays – Gray Panthers	238,642	0.51	0	178,450	0.38	0	0	0
Ecological Democratic Party	183,715	0.39	0	200,138	0.43	0	0	0
Natural Law Party	73,193	0.16	0	59,087	0.13	0	0	New
Human Environment Animal Protection Party	71,643	0.15	0				0	New
Party of Bible-abiding Christians	65,651	0.14	0	26,864	0.06	0	0	New
Statt Party	63,354	0.13	0	7,927	0.02	0	0	New
Bavaria Party	42,491	0.09	0	3,324	0.01	0	0	0
Car-drivers' and Citizens' Interests Party	21,533	0.05	0	1,654	0.00	0	0	New
Christian Centre	19,887	0.04	0	3,559	0.01	0	0	0
Party of the Willing to Work and Socially Vulnerable	15,040	0.03	0	489	0.00	0	0	New
Marxist–Leninist Party	10,038	0.02	0	4,932	0.01	0	0	0
Bürgerrechtsbewegung Solidarität	8,103	0.02	0	8,032	0.02	0	0	0
Christian League	5,195	0.01	0	3,788	0.01	0	0	0
Centre Party	3,757	0.01	0	1,489	0.00	0	0	0
Federation of Socialist Workers	1,285	0.00	0				0	0
Free Citizens' Union				8,193	0.02	0	0	New
German Social Union				2,395	0.01	0	0	0
German Communist Party				693	0.00	0	0	0
German People's Party				606	0.00	0	0	New
Free Social Union				467	0.00	0	0	0
Communist Party of Germany				426	0.00	0	0	0
Independent Workers' Party				302	0.00	0	0	0
Liberal Democrats				221	0.00	0	0	New
Federation for a Complete Germany				107	0.00	0	0	New
Democrats				104	0.00	0	0	New
Independents and voter groups				34,080	0.07	0	0	0
Total	47,105,174	100.00	344	46,949,356	100.00	328	672	+10
Valid votes	47,105,174	98.67		46,949,356	98.35			
Invalid/blank votes	632,825	1.33		788,643	1.65			
Total votes	47,737,999	100.00		47,737,999	100.00			
Registered voters/turnout	60,452,009	78.97		60,452,009	78.97			
Source: Bundeswahlleiter

Seat results – SPD in red, combined Greens in green, PDS in purple, FDP in yellow, CDU/CSU in black

=== Results by state ===
Second vote (Zweitstimme, or votes for party list)

State results in %	CDU/CSU	SPD	GRÜNE	FDP	PDS	REP	all others
Baden-Württemberg	43.3	30.7	9.6	9.9	0.8	3.1	2.6
Bavaria	51.2	29.6	6.3	6.4	0.5	2.8	3.2
Berlin	31.4	34.0	10.2	5.2	14.8	1.9	2.5
Brandenburg	28.1	45.1	2.9	2.6	19.3	1.1	0.9
Bremen	30.2	45.5	11.1	7.2	2.7	1.7	1.6
Hamburg	34.9	39.7	12.6	7.2	2.2	1.7	1.7
Hesse	40.7	37.2	9.3	8.1	1.1	2.4	1.2
Mecklenburg-Vorpommern	38.5	28.8	3.6	3.4	23.6	1.2	0.9
Lower Saxony	41.3	40.6	7.1	7.7	1.0	1.2	1.1
North Rhine-Westphalia	38.0	43.1	7.4	7.6	1.0	1.3	1.6
Rhineland-Palatinate	43.8	39.4	6.2	6.9	0.6	1.9	1.2
Saarland	37.2	48.8	5.8	4.3	0.7	1.6	1.6
Saxony	48.0	24.3	4.8	3.8	16.7	1.4	1.0
Saxony-Anhalt	38.8	33.4	3.6	4.1	18.0	1.0	1.1
Schleswig-Holstein	41.5	39.6	8.3	7.4	1.1	1.0	1.1
Thuringia	41.0	30.2	4.9	4.1	17.2	1.4	1.2

==== Constituency seats ====
State	Total seats	Seats won			
State	Total seats	CDU	SPD	CSU	PDS
Baden-Württemberg	37	37			
Bavaria	45		1	44	
Berlin	13	6	3		4
Brandenburg	12		12		
Bremen	3		3		
Hamburg	7	1	6		
Hesse	22	14	8		
Lower Saxony	31	17	14		
Mecklenburg-Vorpommern	9	7	2		
North Rhine-Westphalia	71	31	40		
Rhineland-Palatinate	16	12	4		
Saarland	5		5		
Saxony	21	21			
Saxony-Anhalt	13	10	3		
Schleswig-Holstein	11	9	2		
Thuringia	12	12			
Total	328	177	103	44	4

==== List seats ====
State	Total seats	Seats won					
State	Total seats	SPD	CDU	Grüne	FDP	PDS	CSU
Baden-Württemberg	42	25		8	8	1	
Bavaria	47	28		6	6	1	6
Berlin	14	6	3	3	2		
Brandenburg	11		6		1	4	
Bremen	3		2	1			
Hamburg	7		4	2	1		
Hesse	27	11	6	5	4	1	
Lower Saxony	36	14	11	5	5	1	
Mecklenburg-Vorpommern	6	2			1	3	
North Rhine-Westphalia	77	26	27	11	12	1	
Rhineland-Palatinate	17	10	3	2	2		
Saarland	4		4				
Saxony	18	9		2	1	6	
Saxony-Anhalt	10	4		1	1	4	
Schleswig-Holstein	13	8	1	2	2		
Thuringia	12	6		1	1	4	
Total	344	149	67	49	47	26	6

== Post-election ==
The coalition between the CDU/CSU and the FDP was able to continue in power with Helmut Kohl as chancellor.

The PDS won four constituency seats in its power base of the former East Berlin, qualifying it for proportional representation even though the party won 4.4 percent of the vote, just short of the 5% electoral threshold required for full parliamentary status. Under a longstanding electoral law intended to benefit regional parties, any party that wins at least three constituency seats is entitled to its share of proportionally-elected seats, regardless of vote share.

This was the first time in the history of the Federal Republic that the FDP was not the third-largest party in the chamber.

== Sources ==
- The Federal Returning Officer
- Psephos
