= 1998 Saxony-Anhalt state election =

State election in Saxony-Anhalt, Germany

- 26 April 1998

All 116 seats in the Landtag of Saxony-Anhalt 59 seats needed for a majority
- Turnout: 1,495,531 (71.5%) ▲16.7%
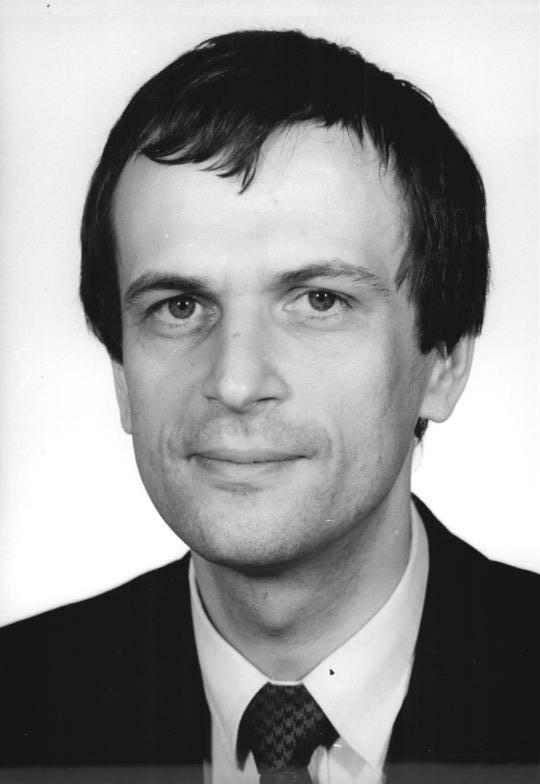

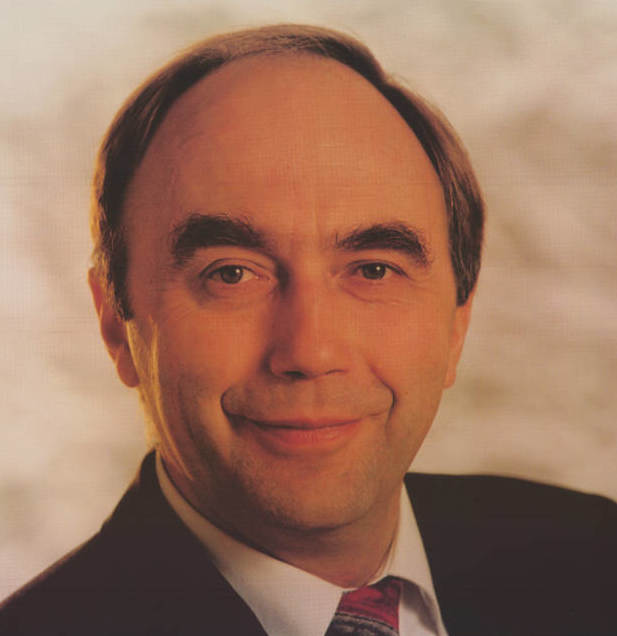

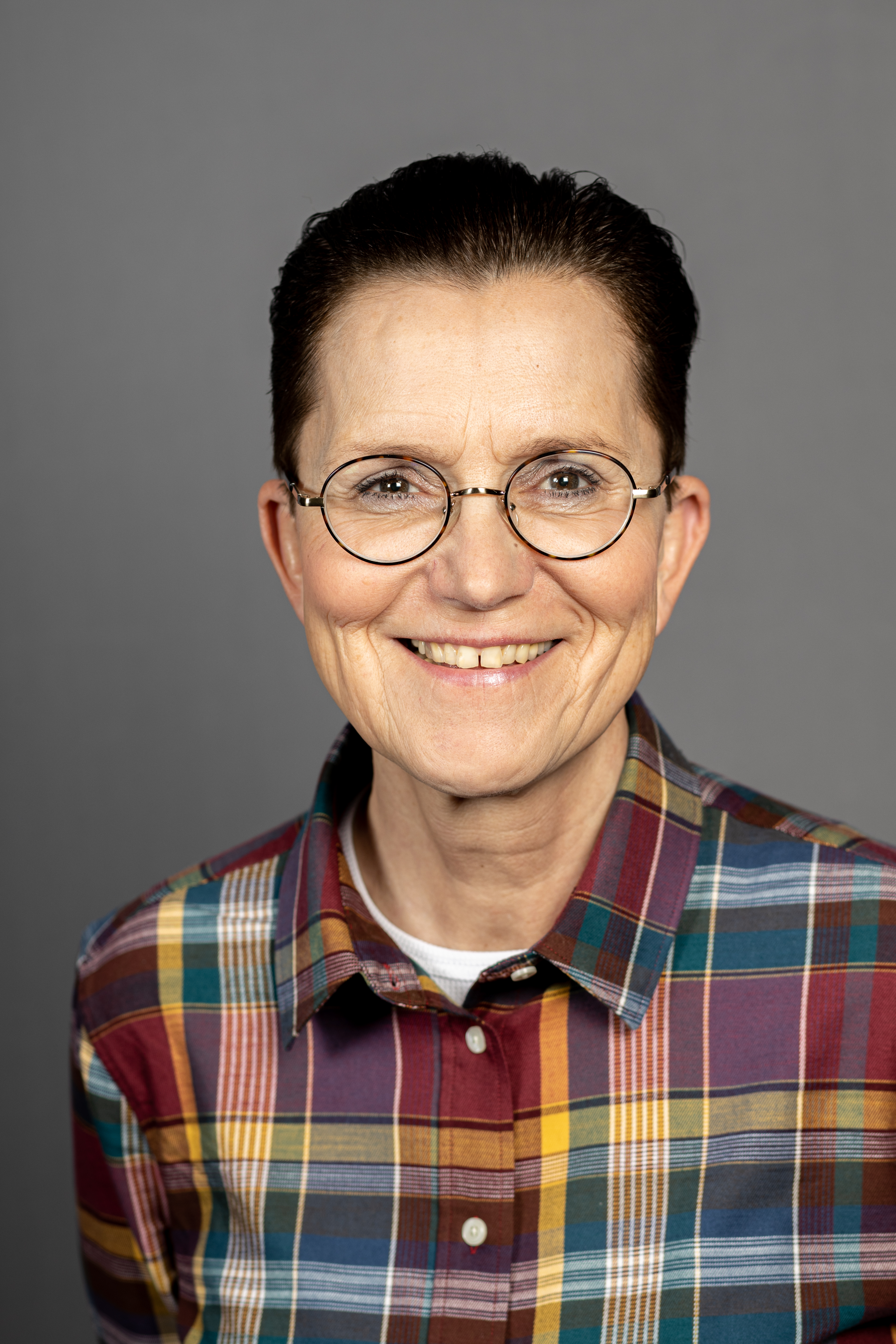
	First party	Second party
Leader	Reinhard Höppner	Christopher Bergner
Party	SPD	CDU
Last election	36 seats, 34.0%	37 seats, 34.4%
Seats won	47	28
Seat change	▲11	▼9
Popular vote	536,501	329,282
Percentage	35.9%	22.0%
Swing	▲1.9%	▼12.4%
	Third party	Fourth party
		DVU
Leader	Petra Sitte	Helmut Wolf
Party	PDS	DVU
Last election	21 seats, 19.9%	Did not run
Seats won	25	16
Seat change	▲4	▲16
Popular vote	293,475	192,352
Percentage	19.6%	12.9%
Swing	▼0.3%	▲12.9%
- Results for the single-member constituencies
Minister-President before election
Reinhard Höppner
SPD
Elected Minister-President
Reinhard Höppner
SPD

The 1998 Saxony-Anhalt state election was held on 26 April 1998 to elect the members of the 3rd Landtag of Saxony-Anhalt. The incumbent government was a minority coalition of the Social Democratic Party (SPD) and The Greens led by Minister-President Reinhard Höppner, supported by the Party of Democratic Socialism (PDS). The Christian Democratic Union (CDU) suffered major losses, mostly to the national conservative German People's Union (DVU). The Greens fell out of the Landtag. After the election, the SPD formed a new minority government alone with the support of the PDS, and Höppner continued in office.

== Parties ==
The table below lists parties represented in the 2nd Landtag of Saxony-Anhalt.

Name		Ideology	Leader(s)	1994 result	
Name		Ideology	Leader(s)	Votes (%)	Seats
CDU	Christian Democratic Union of Germany; Christlich Demokratische Union Deutschlands	Christian democracy		34.4%	37 / 99
SPD	Social Democratic Party of Germany; Sozialdemokratische Partei Deutschlands	Social democracy	Reinhard Höppner	34.0%	36 / 99
PDS	Party of Democratic Socialism; Partei des Demokratischen Sozialismus	Democratic socialism		19.9%	21 / 99
Grüne	Alliance 90/The Greens; Bündnis 90/Die Grünen	Green politics		5.1%	5 / 99

== Election result ==
Summary of the 26 April 1998 election results for the Landtag of Saxony-Anhalt
Party	Votes	%	+/-	Seats	+/-	Seats %
Social Democratic Party (SPD)	536,501	35.9	▲1.9	47	▲11	40.5
Christian Democratic Union (CDU)	329,282	22.0	▼12.4	28	▼9	24.1
Party of Democratic Socialism (PDS)	293,475	19.6	▼0.3	25	▲4	21.6
German People's Union (DVU)	192,352	12.9	▲12.9	16	▲16	13.8
Free Democratic Party (FDP)	63,250	4.2	▲0.7	0	±0	0
Alliance 90/The Greens (Grüne)	48,542	3.2	▼1.9	0	▼5	0
Others	32,219	2.1		0	±0	0
Total	1,495,531	100.0		116	▲17	
Voter turnout		71.5	▲16.7			

Popular Vote
SPD	35.87%
CDU	22.02%
PDS	19.62%
DVU	12.86%
FDP	4.23%
GRÜNE	3.25%
Other	2.15%

Landtag seats
SPD	40.52%
CDU	24.14%
PDS	21.55%
DVU	13.79%

== Sources ==
- Landtagswahl 1998
