= Gerd Gies =

German politician

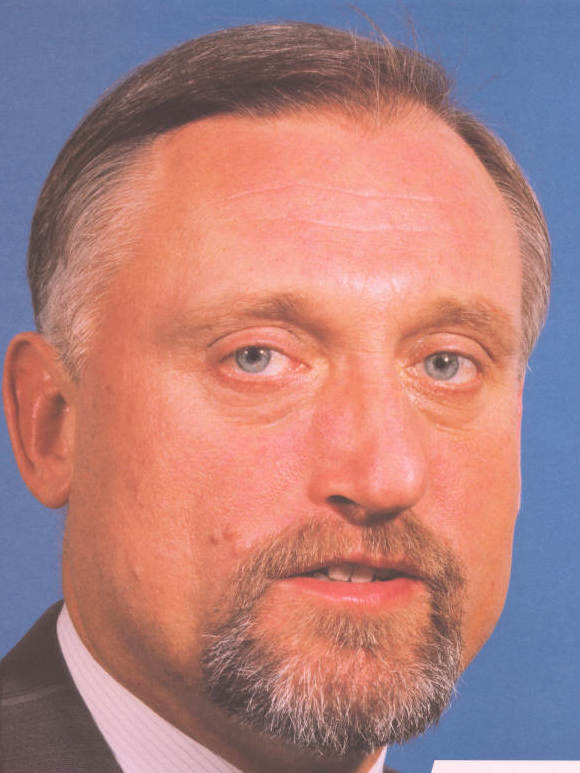
- Gerd Gies (1990)

Minister-President of Saxony-Anhalt
- In office 28 October 1990 – 4 July 1991
- Deputy: Gerd Brunner
- Preceded by: Karl-Hermann Steinberg (as Landesbevollmächtigter)
- Succeeded by: Werner Münch

Member of the Landtag of Saxony-Anhalt
- In office 21 July 1994 – 25 May 1998
- Preceded by: Constituency established
- Succeeded by: Jürgen Barth
- Constituency: Gardelegen-Klötze
- In office 28 October 1990 – 21 July 1994
- Preceded by: Armin Kleinau
- Succeeded by: multi-member district
- Constituency: Christian Democratic Union List

Member of the Volkskammer for Magdeburg
- In office 5 April 1990 – 2 October 1990
- Preceded by: Constituency established
- Succeeded by: Constituency abolished

Personal details
- Born: 24 May 1943 (age 83) Stendal, Nazi Germany (now Germany)
- Party: Christian Democratic Union (1990–)
- Other political affiliations: Christian Democratic Union (East Germany) (1970–1990)
- Education: Leipzig University (Dr. med. vet.)
- Occupation: Politician; Veterinarian; Businessman

Gerd Gies (born 24 May 1943 in Stendal, Germany) is a German politician (CDU). He was the 1st Minister President of Saxony-Anhalt after its creation following the reunification of Germany. Gies held this office from October 1990 to 4 July 1991, when he was forced to resign over accusations of having previously worked for the Stasi. He was succeeded by Werner Münch. Gies remained a parliamentary delegate until 1998.

Afterwards, Gies worked in the energy industry and served on the board of Electrabel Germany.

Preceded by position created	Minister-President of Saxony-Anhalt	Succeeded by Werner Münch
