= Werner Münch =

German politician (born 1940)

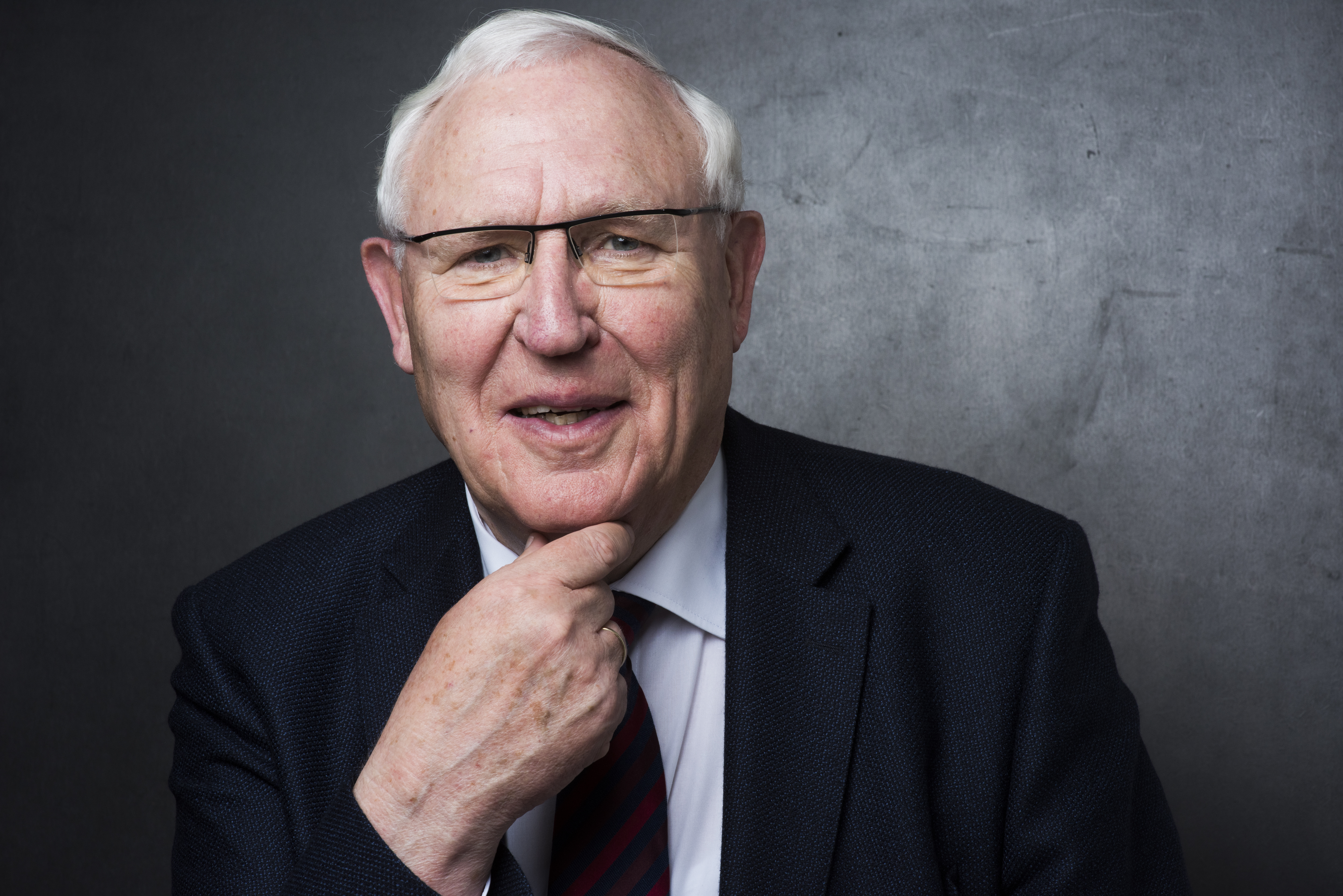
- Münch (2019)

Minister-President of Saxony-Anhalt
- In office 4 July 1991 – 2 December 1993
- Deputy: Gerd Brunner; Wolfgang Rauls
- Preceded by: Gerd Gies
- Succeeded by: Christoph Bergner

Minister of Finance of Saxony-Anhalt
- In office 2 November 1990 – 4 July 1991
- Minister-President: Gerd Gies
- Preceded by: Position established
- Succeeded by: Wolfgang Böhmer

Member of the European Parliament for Lower Saxony
- In office 24 July 1984 – 19 November 1990
- Preceded by: multi-member district
- Succeeded by: Brigitte Langenhagen

Personal details
- Born: 25 September 1940 (age 86) Kirchhellen, Germany
- Party: Independent
- Other political affiliations: Christian Democratic Union (1972–2009)
- Education: University of Freiburg
- Occupation: Politician; Consultant; Political Scientist

Werner Münch (born 25 September 1940 in Kirchhellen, Province of Westphalia) is a German politician (CDU).

After serving as a soldier in the Bundeswehr (West German armed forces) for six years, Münch studied political science at the University of Freiburg and completed his Ph.D. at Osnabrück University in 1974. From 1972 on, he taught as a lecturer, and from 1976 as a professor of political science and sociology at the Catholic College of Northern Germany (Katholische Fachhochschule Norddeutschland) in Osnabrück/Vechta. He was the rector of that college from 1973 to 1978. In 1984 Münch was elected to the European Parliament where he was a member of the Christian democratic EPP group. He was re-elected in 1989 but resigned his seat in the European Parliament upon becoming a state minister in 1990.

During the Peaceful Revolution in early 1990 he campaigned for the East German CDU. In the same year, he unsuccessfully ran for the position of state chairman of the CDU in Lower Saxony. After the reunification of Germany in October 1990, he moved to the newly formed state of Saxony-Anhalt where he became the first finance minister under minister-president Gerd Gies (CDU). After Gies had to resign, Münch succeeded him as minister-president of Saxony-Anhalt on 4 July 1991. In December 1991, he was also elected chairman of the CDU state association of Saxony-Anhalt. He resigned as minister-president on 28 November 1993 due to allegations of having fraudulently obtained an excessive salary. However, he was acquitted of all charges in court. He was succeeded by Christoph Bergner (CDU).

After retiring from politics, Münch worked as an independent management consultant, then as a lobbyist for Deutsche Bahn at the European Union in Brussels. From 2001, he was an advisor to the Bulgarian government on preparations for the country's accession to the EU and later a political and economic advisor in Azerbaijan. From 2006 to 2008, he once again taught sociology at a private Catholic college, Gustav Siewerth Academy.

On 25 February 2009 Münch quit membership of the CDU after 37 years. He motivated his step with the "loss of conservative skills" of the party under the leadership of Angela Merkel. As example he mentioned her critical words against Pope Benedict XVI.

Preceded by Gerd Gies	Minister President of Saxony-Anhalt; 1991–1993	Succeeded by Christoph Bergner
