= Petra Sitte =

German politician

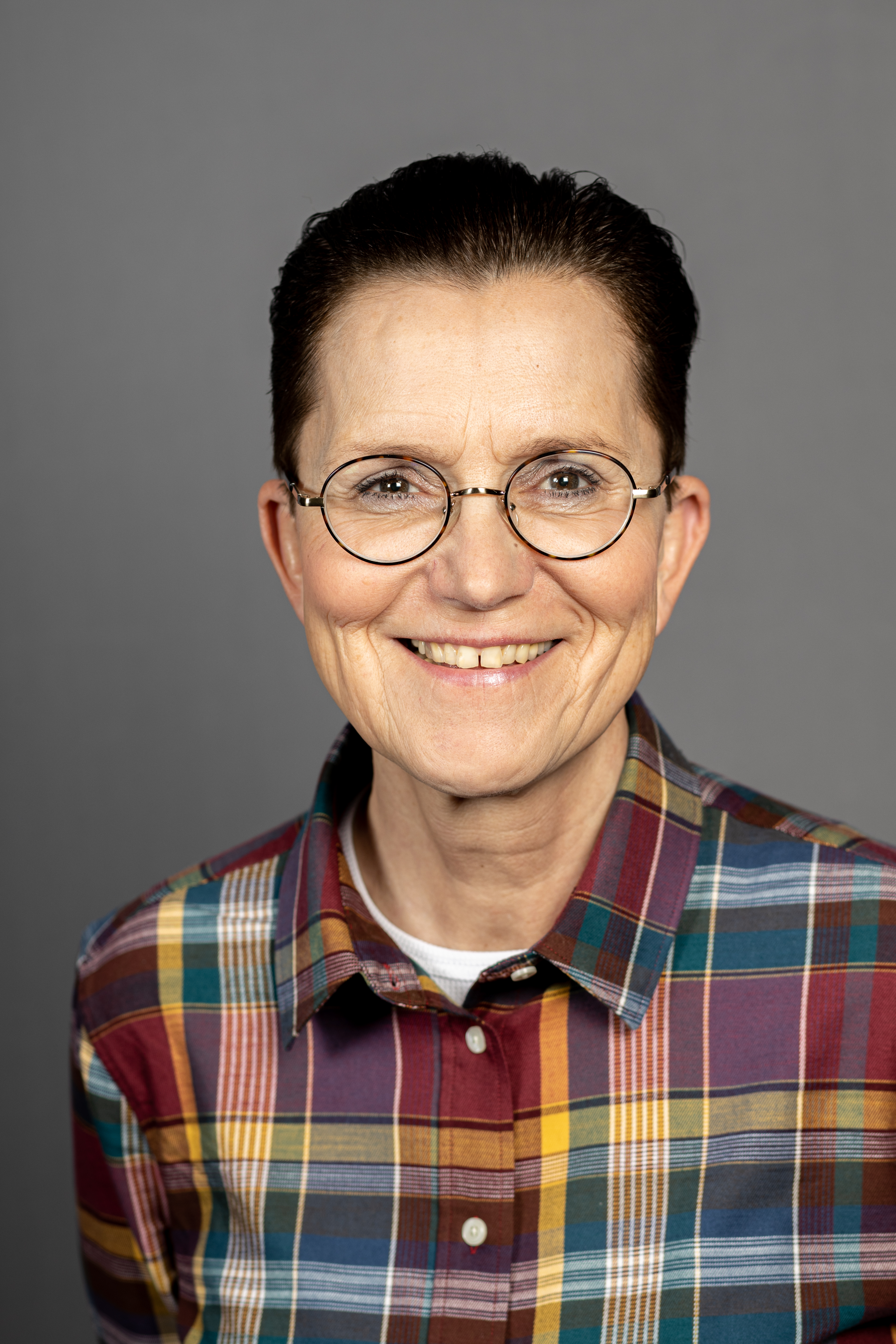
- Sitte in 2020

Member of the Bundestag
- In office 2005–2025

Personal details
- Born: 1 December 1960 (age 65) Dresden, East Germany (now Germany)
- Party: The Left

Petra Sitte (born 1 December 1960) is a German politician. She represents The Left. Petra Sitte served as a member of the Bundestag from the state of Saxony-Anhalt from 2005 until 2025.

== Life ==
Sitte was born in Dresden, Saxony. After graduating from high school in 1979, she studied economics at the Martin Luther University of Halle-Wittenberg, graduating in 1983 with a degree in economics. After subsequent research studies and work as an assistant at the Martin Luther University, she received her doctorate here in 1987. From 1990 to 2005 she was a member of the state parliament of Saxony-Anhalt. She became member of the Bundestag after the 2005 German federal election. She was a member of the Digital Agenda Committee and the Committee on Education, Research and Technology Assessment. In her group she was vice-chairwoman. In the 2025 German federal election she did not stand for re-election.
