= Reinhard Höppner =

German politician (1948–2014)

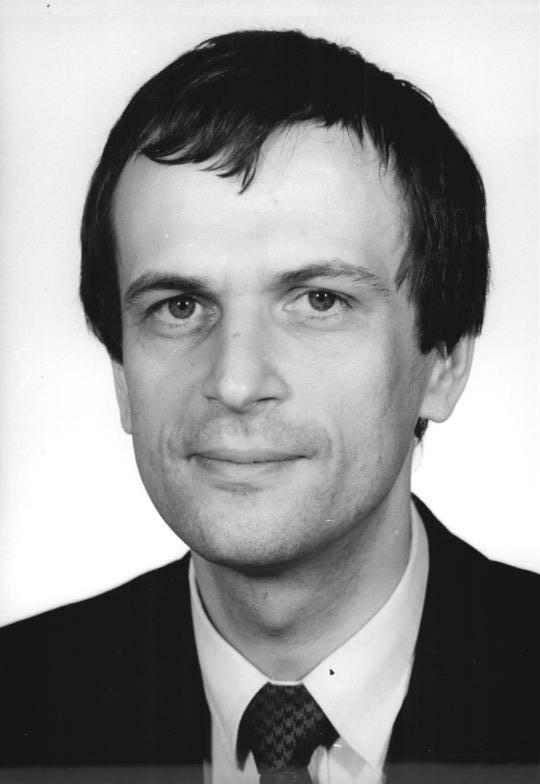
- Höppner in 1990

Minister-President of Saxony-Anhalt
- In office 21 July 1994 – 16 May 2002
- Deputy: Heidrun Heidecke; Gerlinde Kuppe
- Preceded by: Christoph Bergner
- Succeeded by: Wolfgang Böhmer

Member of the Landtag of Saxony-Anhalt
- In office 16 May 2002 – 23 April 2006
- Preceded by: multi-member district
- Succeeded by: multi-member district
- Constituency: Social Democratic Party List
- In office 28 October 1990 – 16 May 2002
- Preceded by: Constituency established
- Succeeded by: Gerhard Ruden
- Constituency: Magdeburg II
Wende politically career (1990)
Vice President of the Volkskammer (on proposal of the SPD)
In office 5 April 1990 – 2 October 1990
Preceded by	Position established
Succeeded by	Position abolished
Member of the Volkskammer for Magdeburg
In office 5 April 1990 – 2 October 1990
Preceded by	Constituency established
Succeeded by	Constituency abolished

Personal details
- Born: 2 December 1948 Haldensleben, Saxony-Anhalt, Soviet occupation zone(now Germany)
- Died: 9 June 2014 (aged 65) Magdeburg, Saxony-Anhalt, Germany
- Cause of death: Cancer
- Party: Social Democratic Party (1990–2014)
- Other political affiliations: Social Democratic Party in the GDR (1989–1990)
- Spouse: Renate Höppner
- Children: 3
- Parent: Franz Höppner
- Education: Technische Universität Dresden (Dr. rer. nat.)
- Occupation: Politician; Mathematician; Author; Academic

Reinhard Höppner (2 December 1948 – 9 June 2014) was a German politician (SPD) and writer.

Höppner held a Dr. rer. nat. in mathematics.

In 1990, in the first (and last) free election in the assembly's history, he was elected a member of the East German People's Chamber (Volkskammer), becoming the assembly's vice president.

He became the 4th Minister President of Saxony-Anhalt in July 1994 when, his SPD (party) having failed to secure an outright majority, entered into a minority governing coalition with the Green party. This was controversial at the time because most had expected that the SPD, if denied an overall majority, would govern in coalition with the PDS, successor to the old East German ruling party: together the SPD and PDS would have had an overall majority. The so-called Magdeburg model for a minority SPD/Green coalition that excluded the PDS but nevertheless was tolerated (not voted down) by them was subsequently followed in other regional assemblies. Höppner remained in office until 16 May 2002, when he was succeeded by Wolfgang Böhmer.

Political offices
Preceded by Christoph Bergner	Minister President of Saxony-Anhalt; 1994–2002	Succeeded by Wolfgang Böhmer
