= Henry W. Kumpf =

American football player and coach (1905–1990)

Biographical details
- Born: October 2, 1905; Buffalo, New York, U.S.
- Died: March 21, 1990 (aged 84); Laguna Hills, California, U.S.

Playing career

Football
- 1926–1928: Columbia
- Position: Halfback

Coaching career (HC unless noted)

Football
- 1930–1931: Cortland Normal
- 1932–1938: RPI

Track
- 1945–1961: RPI

Swimming
- 1953–1962: RPI

Administrative career (AD unless noted)
- 1962–1969: RPI

Head coaching record
- Overall: 16–47–3 (football); 47–46–1 (track); 56–34–1 (swimming)

Henry William Kumpf Jr. (October 2, 1905 – March 21, 1990) was an American football coach. He was the head coach football at State University of New York at Cortland in Cortland, New York from 1930 to 1931, where he accumulated a record of 6–6–1. He was later the head football coach at Rensselaer Polytechnic Institute in Troy, New York from 1932 to 1938, where he had a record of 10–41–2. A native of Buffalo, New York, Kumpf played college football as a halfback at Columbia University from 1926 to 1928.

== Head coaching record ==
=== College football ===
Year	Team	Overall	Conference	Standing	Bowl/playoffs
Cortland Red Dragons (Independent) (1930–1931)
1930	Cortland	4–3			
1931	Cortland	2–3–1			
Cortland Normal:		6–6–1			
RPI Engineers (Independent) (1932–1938)
1932	RPI	2–5–1			
1933	RPI	3–4			
1934	RPI	0–8			
1935	RPI	0–7			
1936	RPI	2–5			
1937	RPI	2–5–1			
1938	RPI	1–7			
RPI:		10–41–2			
Total:		16–47–3			
