= 1990 Saxony-Anhalt state election =

State election in Saxony-Anhalt

- 14 October 1990

All 106 seats in the Landtag of Saxony-Anhalt 54 seats needed for a majority
- Turnout: 1,412,512 (65.1%)
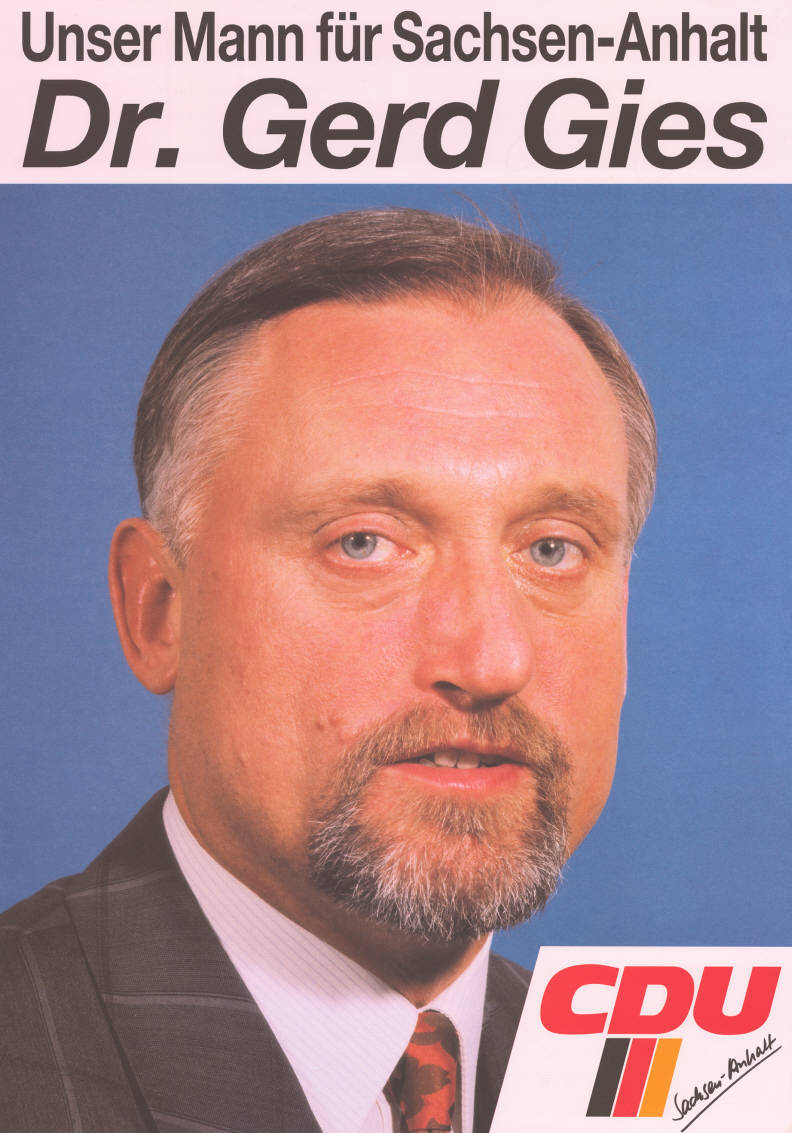

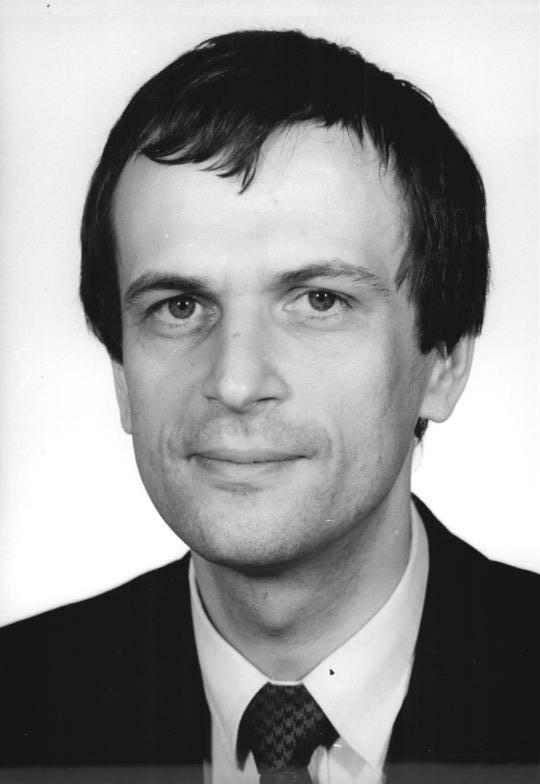

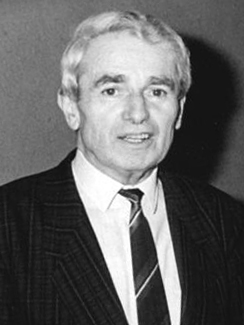

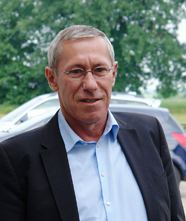
	First party	Second party	Third party
Leader	Gerd Gies	Reinhard Höppner	Gerd Brunner
Party	CDU	SPD	FDP
Seats won	48	27	14
Popular vote	550,815	367,254	190,800
Percentage	39.0%	26.0%	13.5%
	Fourth party	Fifth party
Leader	Roland Claus
Party	PDS	Greens
Seats won	12	5
Popular vote	169,319	74,696
Percentage	12.0%	5.3%
- Results for the single-member constituencies
Elected Minister-President
Gerd Gies
CDU

The 1990 Saxony-Anhalt state election was held on 14 October 1990 to elect the members of the first Landtag of Saxony-Anhalt. It was the first election held in Saxony-Anhalt since the reunification of Germany, which took place on 3 October. The Christian Democratic Union (CDU) led by Gerd Gies emerged as the largest party with 39.0%, followed by the Social Democratic Party (SPD) with 26.0%. The CDU formed a coalition with the Free Democratic Party (FDP), and Gies became Saxony-Anhalt's first post-reunification Minister-President.

== Parties ==
The table below lists parties which won seats in the election.

Name		Ideology	Leader(s)
CDU	Christian Democratic Union of Germany; Christlich Demokratische Union Deutschlands	Christian democracy	Gerd Gies
SPD	Social Democratic Party of Germany; Sozialdemokratische Partei Deutschlands	Social democracy	Reinhard Höppner
FDP	Free Democratic Party; Freie Demokratische Partei	Classical liberalism	Gerd Brunner
PDS	Party of Democratic Socialism; Partei des Demokratischen Sozialismus	Democratic socialism	Roland Claus
Grüne	The Greens; Die Grünen	Green politics	

== Election result ==
Summary of the 14 October 1990 election results for the Landtag of Saxony-Anhalt
Party	Votes	%	Seats	Seats %
Christian Democratic Union (CDU)	550,815	39.0	48	45.3
Social Democratic Party (SPD)	367,254	26.0	27	25.5
Free Democratic Party (FDP)	190,800	13.5	14	13.2
Party of Democratic Socialism (PDS)	169,319	12.0	12	11.3
The Greens (Grüne)	74,696	5.3	5	4.7
German Social Union (DSU)	24,144	1.7	0	0
Democratic Women's League (DFD)	15,628	1.1	0	0
Others	19,856	1.4	0	0
Total	1,412,512	100.0	106	
Voter turnout		65.1		

Popular Vote
CDU	39.00%
SPD	26.00%
FDP	13.51%
PDS	11.99%
GRÜNE	5.29%
DSU	1.71%
DFD	1.11%
Other	1.41%

Landtag seats
CDU	45.28%
SPD	25.47%
FDP	13.21%
PDS	11.32%
GRÜNE	4.72%

== Sources ==
- [www.stala.sachsen-anhalt.de/wahlen/lt90/index.html Landtagswahl 1990]
