= List of minister-presidents of Saxony-Anhalt =

Minister President of Saxony-Anhalt
- Ministerpräsident des Landes Sachsen-Anhalt
- Coat of arms of Saxony-Anhalt

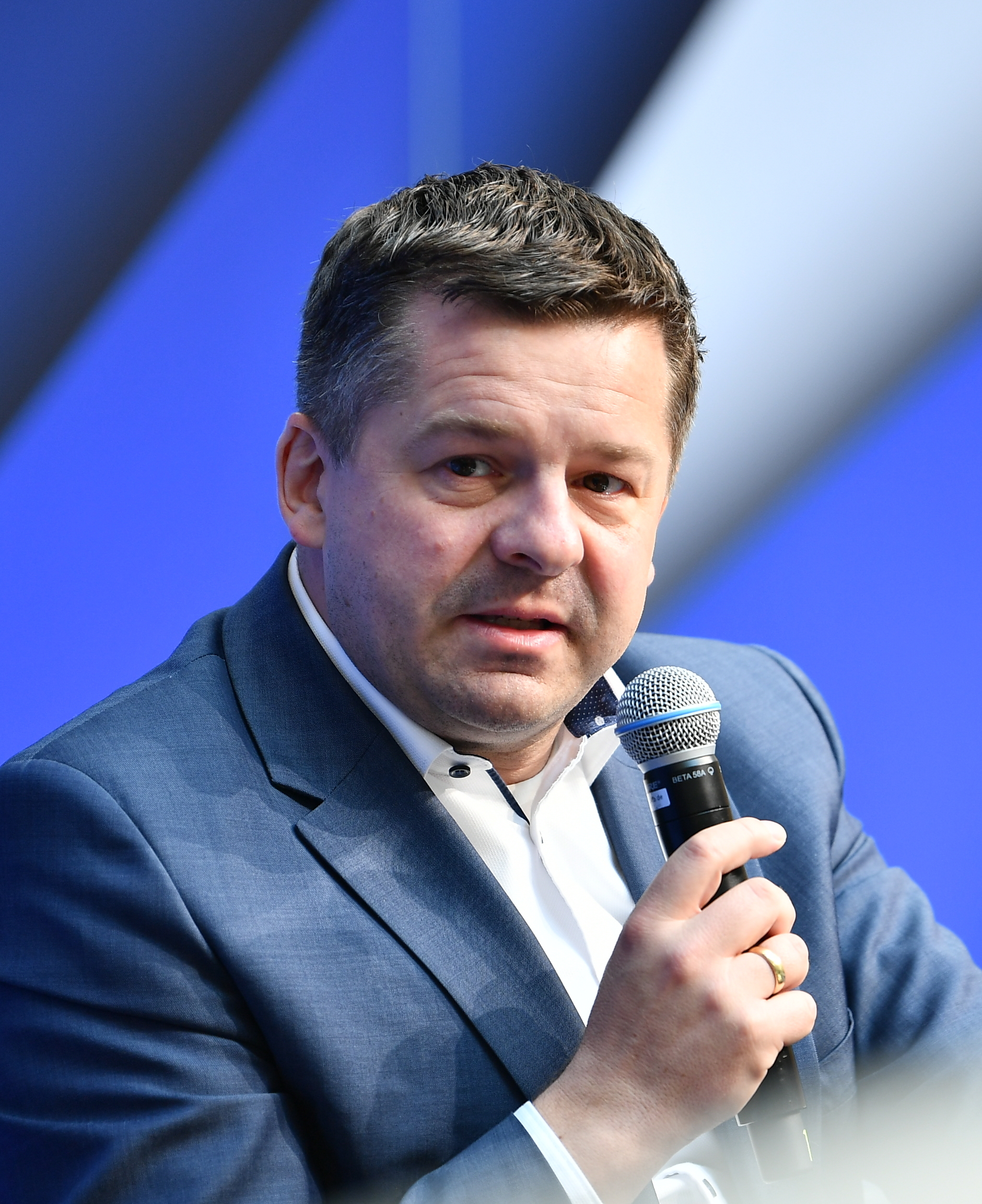
- Incumbent; Sven Schulze (caretaker) since 28 January 2026
- Residence: Magdeburg
- Appointer: Landtag of Saxony-Anhalt
- Term length: Until a new Landtag convenes, resignation or removal; caretaker service until a successor takes office
- Inaugural holder: Gerd Gies
- Formation: 3 October 1990
- Salary: Regulated by legislation
- Website: sachsen-anhalt.de/politik-verwaltung/page/ministerpraesident

The minister president of Saxony-Anhalt is the head of government of the German state of Saxony-Anhalt. The minister-president is elected by the Landtag and determines the guidelines of government policy. The present office dates from the re-establishment of Saxony-Anhalt as a state of the Federal Republic of Germany on 3 October 1990, during German reunification.

The current minister-president is Sven Schulze, who succeeded Reiner Haseloff on 28 January 2026. Schulze took office heading a coalition government of the Christian Democratic Union, the Social Democratic Party and the Free Democratic Party. As of October 2026, he remains in office in a caretaker capacity. Haseloff had succeeded Wolfgang Böhmer on 19 April 2011.

The minister-president's official seat is the state chancellery (German: Staatskanzlei), located in the Palais am Fürstenwall in the state capital, Magdeburg.

== List ==
=== Saxony-Anhalt (1990–present) ===
Political party: CDU SPD

Minister-presidents since 1990
Portrait	Name (Born–Died)	Term of office			Political party	Cabinet
Portrait	Name (Born–Died)	Took office	Left office	Days	Political party	Cabinet
In accordance with the Unification Treaty, the designated state representative Karl-Hermann Steinberg (CDU) headed the state administration from 3 to 28 October 1990, pending the election of the first minister-president.
1	Gerd Gies (born 1943)	28 October 1990	4 July 1991 resigned	249 days	CDU	I
2	Werner Münch (born 1940)	4 July 1991	28 November 1993 (Note: The Landtag's official chronology dates the end of Münch's term to his resignation on 28 November 1993; Bergner took office on 2 December 1993.) resigned	2 years, 147 days	CDU	I
3	Christoph Bergner (born 1948)	2 December 1993	21 July 1994	231 days	CDU	I
4	Reinhard Höppner (1948–2014)	21 July 1994	16 May 2002	7 years, 299 days	SPD	I II
5	Wolfgang Böhmer (1936–2025)	16 May 2002	19 April 2011	8 years, 338 days	CDU	I II
6	Reiner Haseloff (born 1954)	19 April 2011	28 January 2026 resigned	14 years, 284 days	CDU	I II III
7	Sven Schulze (born 1979)	28 January 2026	Incumbent caretaker	273 days	CDU	I

== Timeline ==
Dates follow the Landtag's official chronology.

== See also ==
- Saxony-Anhalt
- Landtag of Saxony-Anhalt
