= Landtag of Saxony-Anhalt =

State legislature in Germany

Coordinates: 52.127°N 11.636°E

State Diet of Saxony-Anhalt Landtag von Sachsen-Anhalt
- 9th Landtag

Type
- Type: Landtag
- Established: 1946

Leadership
- President of the Landtag: Tobias Rausch, AfD since 6 October 2026
- First Vice President: Hans-Thomas Tillschneider, AfD; 6 October 2026
- Second Vice President: Carsten Borchert, CDU; 6 October 2026

Structure
- Seats: 83
- Political groups: Government (caretaker) (23) CDU (15) SPD (8) Opposition (60) AfD (39) Greens (8) The Left (8) BSW (5)

Elections
- Last election: 6 September 2026
- Next election: 2031

Meeting place
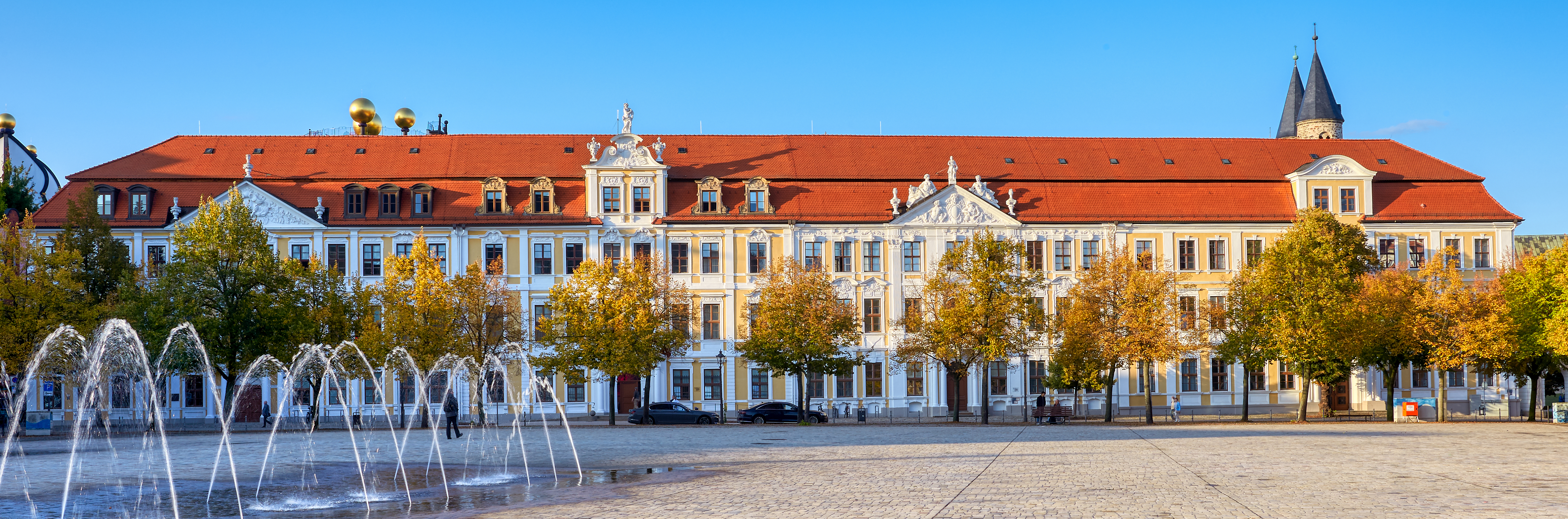

Website
- landtag.sachsen-anhalt.de

The Landtag of Saxony-Anhalt is the parliament of the German federal state Saxony-Anhalt. It convenes in Magdeburg and has a minimum size of 83 members, but if overhang seats are present, proportional leveling seats will be added to ensure proportionality.

The 2026 Saxony-Anhalt state election was held on 6 September 2026. The Alternative for Germany (AfD) became the largest party with 43.8% of second votes and won 39 of the 83 seats in the incoming ninth Landtag. The CDU won 15 seats, while the SPD, The Left, and Alliance 90/The Greens each won eight seats, and the Alliance for Social Justice and Economic Reason (BSW) won five. The ninth legislative period began when the newly elected Landtag convened on 6 October. The incumbent Schulze cabinet will remain as the caretaker government until a new Minister-President is elected.

== Current composition ==
The ninth Landtag, elected in the 2026 Saxony-Anhalt state election, convened on 6 October 2026. Its current composition is as follows:

| Party | Seats |
|---|---|
| Alternative for Germany | 39 |
| Christian Democratic Union (CDU) | 15 |
| Social Democratic Party (SPD) | 8 |
| The Left | 8 |
| Alliance 90/The Greens | 8 |
| Alliance for Social Justice and Economic Reason (BSW) | 5 |

Elections are conducted using a proportional representation system, with a minimum of 5% vote share to receive any seats.

== Historical results ==
In Saxony-Anhalt state elections, there were more abstentions (Nichtwähler) than voters for any party from 1990 to 2021. In 2026, turnout rose to 77.8%, and the AfD won 43.8% of votes and 34% of all eligible voters.

1st Landtag

2nd Landtag

3rd Landtag

4th Landtag

5th Landtag

6th Landtag

7th Landtag

8th Landtag

9th Landtag

Election results 1990–2026

Colors are assigned automatically and do not match political colors

View chart definition.

| Date | Turnout | CDU | SPD | FDP | Left | Green | DVU | AfD | BSW | Others |
|---|---|---|---|---|---|---|---|---|---|---|
| | | CDU | | | | | | | | |
| 14.10.1990 | 65,1 | 39,0 | 26,0 | 13,5 | 12,0 | 5,3 | – | – | – | |
| 26.06.1994 | 54,8 | 34,4 | 34,0 | 3,6 | 19,9 | 5,1 | – | – | – | |
| 26.04.1998 | 71,7 | 22,0 | 35,9 | 4,2 | 19,6 | 3,2 | 12,9 | – | – | |
| 21.04.2002 | 56,5 | 37,3 | 20,0 | 13,3 | 20,4 | 2,0 | – | – | – | Schill 4,5 |
| 26.03.2006 | 44,4 | 36,2 | 21,4 | 6,7 | 24,1 | 3,6 | 3,0 | – | – | |
| 20.03.2011 | 51,2 | 32,5 | 21,5 | 3,8 | 23,7 | 7,1 | – | – | – | NPD 4,6 FW 2,8 |
| 13.03.2016 | 61,1 | 29,8 | 10,6 | 4,9 | 16,3 | 5,2 | – | 24,3 | – | FW 2,2 |
| 06.06.2021 | 60,3 | 37,1 | 8,4 | 6,4 | 11,0 | 5,9 | – | 20,8 | – | FW 3,1 |
| 06.09.2026 | 77,8 | 17,2 | 9,3 | 2,6 | 8,6 | 8,9 | – | 43,8 | 5,3 | FW 1,2 |

== Presidents of the Landtag ==
| Name | Period | Party |
|---|---|---|
| Bruno Böttge | November 18, 1946 – October 1948 | SED |
| Adam Wolfram | 1948–1950 | SED |
| Michael Schöder | 1950–1952 | SED |

| Name | Period | Party |
|---|---|---|
| Klaus Keitel | 1990–1998 | CDU |
| Wolfgang Schaefer | 1998–2002 | SPD |
| Adolf Spotka | 2002–2006 | CDU |
| Dieter Steinecke | 2006–2011 | CDU |
| Detlef Gürth | 2011–2015 | CDU |
| Dieter Steinecke | 2015–2016 | CDU |
| Gabriele Brakebusch | 2016–2021 | CDU |
| Gunnar Schellenberger | 2021–2026 | CDU |
| Tobias Rausch | 2026–present | AfD |
