= Schulze cabinet =

State government of Saxony-Anhalt

Cabinet of Sven Schulze Schulze
- 11th Cabinet of Saxony-Anhalt
- 28 January 2026 – present
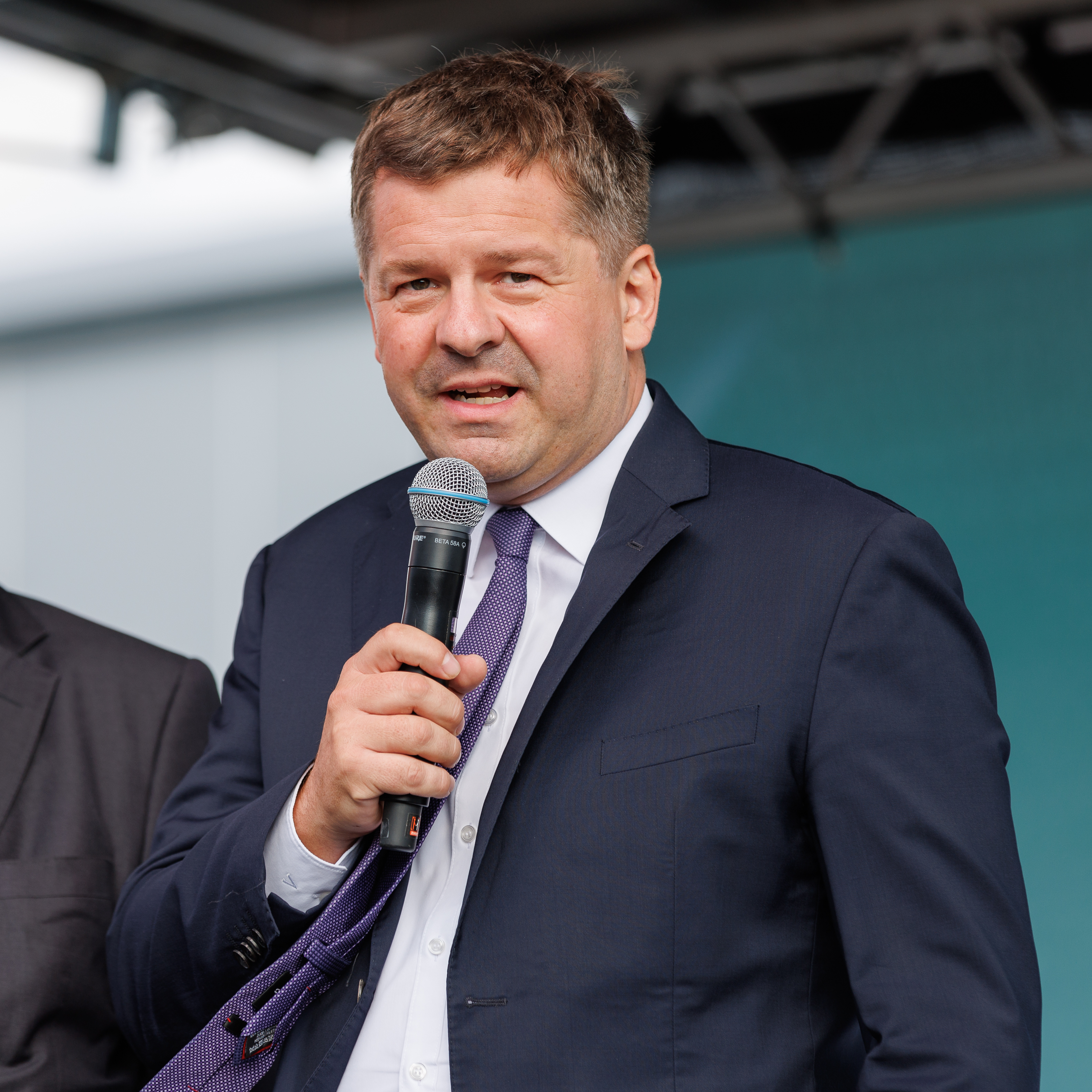
- Sven Schulze in August 2024
- Date formed: 28 January 2026

People and organisations
- Minister-President: Sven Schulze
- Deputy Minister-President: Armin Willingmann; Lydia Hüskens
- No. of ministers: 9
- Member parties: Christian Democratic Union; Social Democratic Party; Free Democratic Party
- Status in legislature: Majority (coalition); 56 / 97 (58%)
- Opposition parties: Alternative for Germany; The Left; Alliance 90/The Greens

History
- Legislature term: 8th Landtag of Saxony-Anhalt
- Predecessor: Third Haseloff cabinet

The Schulze cabinet is the current state government of Saxony-Anhalt, sworn in on 28 January 2026 after Sven Schulze was elected as Minister-President of Saxony-Anhalt by the members of the Landtag of Saxony-Anhalt, succeeding retiring Reiner Haseloff. It is the 11th Cabinet of Saxony-Anhalt.

== Formation ==
The previous cabinet was a coalition government of the CDU, SPD, and FDP led by Minister-President Reiner Haseloff, who resigned.

Sven Schulze was elected Minister-President by the Landtag on 28 January. He was elected with 58 votes in favour to 38 against and one invalid vote.

Minister-President election
Ballot →	28 January 2026
Required majority →	49 out of 97
Sven Schulze	58 / 97
Against	38 / 97
Invalid	1 / 97

== Composition ==
Portfolio	Minister	Party	Took office	Left office	State secretaries
Minister-President	Sven Schulze born 31 July 1979 (age 46)	CDU	28 January 2026	Incumbent	
First Deputy Minister-President Minister for Science, Energy, Climate Protection and Environment	Armin Willingmann born 13 January 1963 (age 63)	SPD	28 January 2026	Incumbent	Thomas Wünsch (Science); Steffen Eichner (Environment)
Second Deputy Minister-President Minister for Infrastructure and Digital Affairs	Lydia Hüskens born 26 March 1964 (age 62)	FDP	28 January 2026	Incumbent	Sven Haller (Infrastructure); Bernd Schlömer (Digital Affairs, Chief information officer)
Minister for Labour, Social Affairs, Health and Equality	Petra Grimm-Benne born 27 April 1962 (age 64)	SPD	28 January 2026	Incumbent	Wolfgang Beck; Susi Möbbeck (Integration)
Head of the Chancellery	Rainer Robra born 15 October 1951 (age 74)	CDU	28 January 2026	Incumbent	Simone Großner (Federal and European Affairs, Representative to the Federal Government)
Minister for Culture	Rainer Robra born 15 October 1951 (age 74)	CDU	28 January 2026	Incumbent	Sebastian Putz (Culture); Jürgen Ude (Structural Change and Large-scale Settlements)
Minister for Interior and Sport	Tamara Zieschang born 21 August 1970 (age 55)	CDU	28 January 2026	Incumbent	Klaus Zimmermann
Minister for Economics, Tourism, Agriculture and Forests	Michael Richter born 27 June 1954 (age 71)	CDU	28 January 2026	Incumbent	Stefanie Pötzsch; Gert Zender
Minister for Finance	Michael Richter born 27 June 1954 (age 71)	CDU	28 January 2026	Incumbent	Rüdiger Malter
Minister for Education	Jan Riedel born 8 June 1982 (age 44)	CDU	28 January 2026	Incumbent	Jürgen Bohm
Minister for Justice and Consumer Protection	Franziska Weidinger born 8 October 1976 (age 49)	CDU	28 January 2026	Incumbent	Steffen Eckold
