= Black–red–yellow coalition =

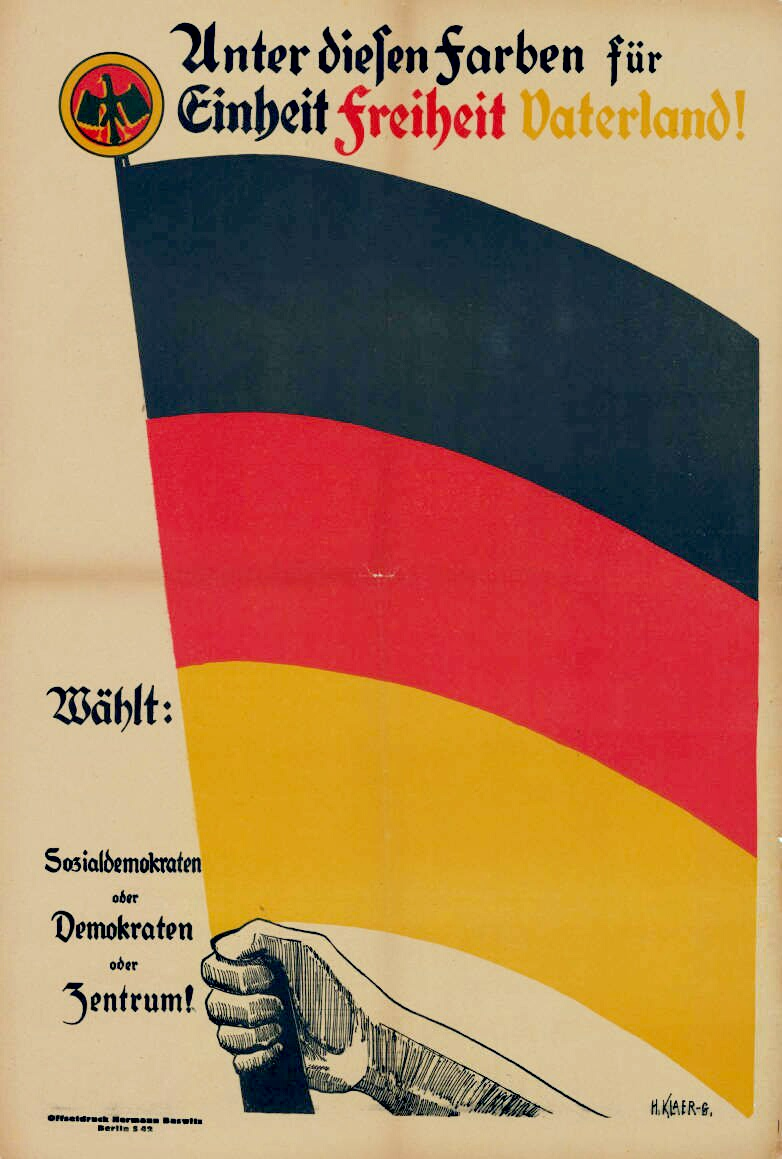
Election poster for the Weimarer Koalition (1924)

In German politics, a black–red–yellow coalition (German: Schwarz-rot-gelbe Koalition), also called a "Germany coalition" (Deutschland-Koalition), is understood to be a coalition between conservative or Christian democratic party (black), with social democratic or socialist party (red), and a liberal party (yellow).

In the Bundestag, a black–red–yellow coalition includes the Christian Democratic Union of Germany (CDU), Social Democratic Party of Germany (SPD) and the Free Democratic Party (FDP). A Germany coalition is merely a Grand coalition (CDU/CSU+SPD) which also includes the FDP.

== Federal level ==
On the federal level, the first coalition of this kind was the Weimar Coalition, formed in the Weimar National Assembly in 1919, consisting of the Centre Party (black), the SPD (red), and the DDP (yellow). It later existed several times in the Reichstag and in some states, including Prussia (Hirsch, Braun I, Marx, and Braun cabinets).

In Germany today, a coalition of the CDU/CSU, SPD, and FDP is referred to as a black-red-yellow coalition. It has so far only existed at the state and local levels.

In Austria, a politically comparable coalition of the ÖVP, SPÖ and NEOS is also called the "candy coalition" because of the combination of the party colours used there (turquoise, red and pink) and has been formed by the Federal Government of Austria under Christian Stocker since March 2025.

== State level ==
=== Berlin ===
In the first election after World War II, the SPD narrowly missed an absolute majority in the 1946 Berlin state election, securing 48.7 percent of the votes cast. Due to the tense political situation against the backdrop of the emerging Cold War, the SPD formed a coalition with the CDU and LDP, leaving the SED in opposition in the city council. Otto Ostrowski (SPD) initially became mayor, but was succeeded in 1947 by his party colleague Ernst Reuter.

Against the backdrop of the Berlin Blockade, this coalition continued in West Berlin even after the 1948 and 1950 elections . Ernst Reuter led it as Lord Mayor and, from 1951, as Governing Mayor. Since the SPD was the strongest party, it must be referred to as a "red-black-yellow coalition." This coalition collapsed after Reuter's death in September 1953. The CDU and FDP, which held 66 seats in the House of Representatives, formed a black-yellow coalition; the SPD, with 61 seats, went into opposition. Walther Schreiber (CDU) became the new Governing Mayor and remained so until the 1954 West Berlin state election.

=== Bremen ===
Following the 1951 Bremen state election, Mayor Wilhelm Kaisen (SPD) formed a coalition of the SPD, FDP, and CDU (Fourth Kaisen Senate). This coalition continued after the 1955 election despite the SPD winning an absolute majority (Fifth Kaisen Senate). After the 1959 state election, the SPD was able to increase its absolute majority, but nevertheless continued to work with the FDP in a social–liberal coalition (Sixth Kaisen Senate), forcing the CDU into opposition.

=== Saarland ===
Following the 1955 Saarland state election, the parties of the so-called Homeland League (CDU, SPD, and FDP/DPS) formed a joint state government under Hubert Ney (CDU) (Ney Cabinet). After Ney's resignation in 1957, the coalition continued under the leadership of Egon Reinert (CDU) until 1959 (First Reinert cabinet). Reinert then formed a government of his CDU party with the SPD and the CVP.

=== Saxony-Anhalt ===
Following the 2021 state election in Saxony-Anhalt, the CDU, SPD, and FDP entered into coalition negotiations in July 2021 and jointly supported Reiner Haseloff in his re-election as Minister-President on 16 September 2021, based on a coalition agreement between these three parties (Third Haseloff cabinet). fter Haseloff's resignation in January 2026, the coalition continued under the leadership of Sven Schulze (Schulze cabinet).

== Local level ==
A Germany coalition has governed Bremerhaven since 2019. In the Saarbrücken district of Mitte, the CDU and SPD have been cooperating with the FDP since 2019. A similar coalition, led by the SPD, has also been in place in the Cologne district of Mülheim since 2019. Likewise, a Germany coalition led by the SPD was formed in the Hamburg-Mitte district in 2019. In the southern Hessian city of Bensheim, a Germany coalition has held a majority in the city council since the 2021 Hessian local elections.
