= Third Haseloff cabinet =

Former state government of Saxony-Anhalt (2021 – 2026)

Third Cabinet of Reiner Haseloff Haselhoff III
- 10th Cabinet of Saxony-Anhalt
- 16 September 2021 – 28 January 2026
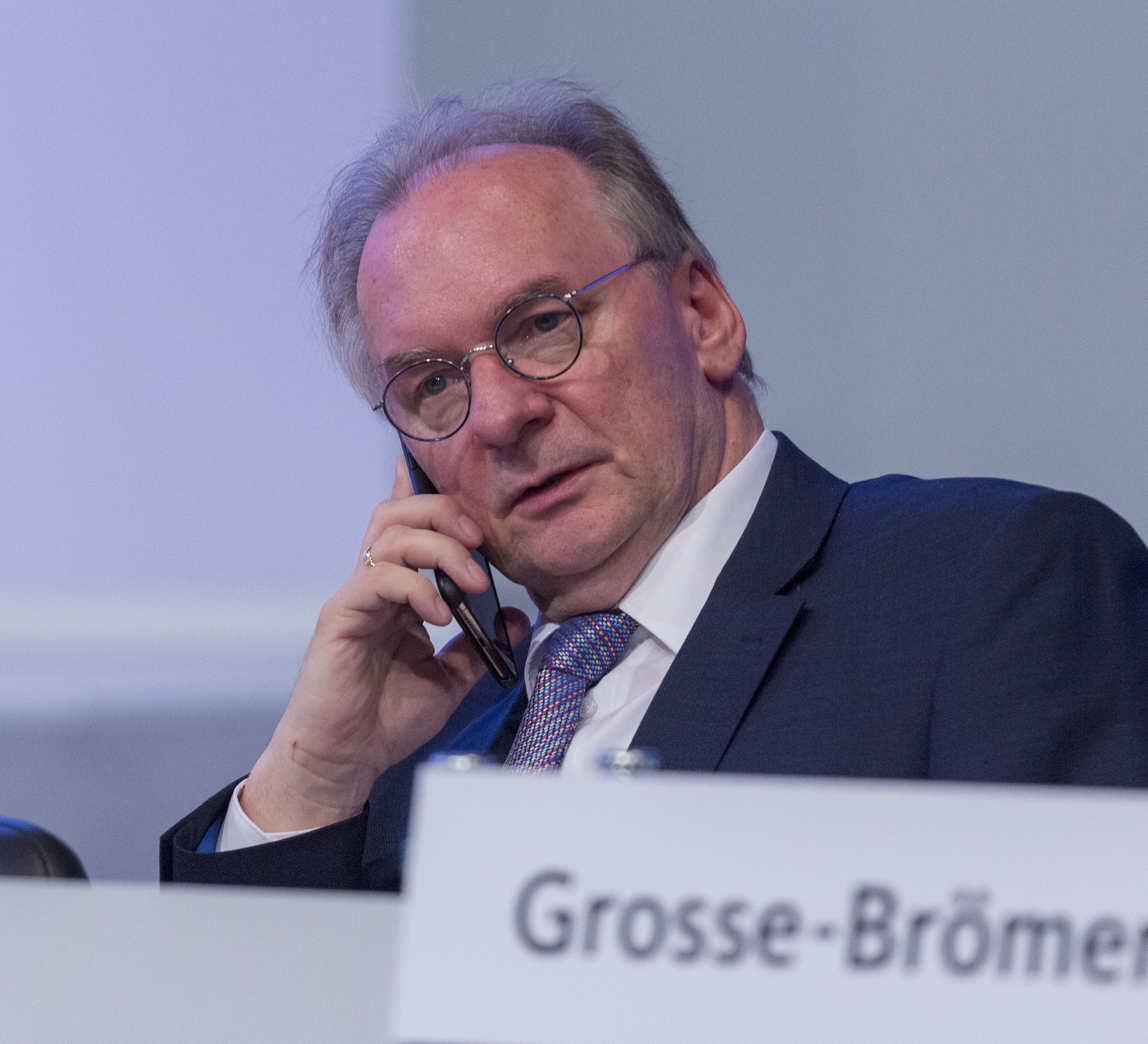
- Reiner Haseloff in November 2019
- Date formed: 16 September 2021
- Date dissolved: 28 January 2026

People and organisations
- Minister-President: Reiner Haseloff
- Deputy Minister-President: Armin Willingmann; Lydia Hüskens
- No. of ministers: 9
- Member parties: Christian Democratic Union; Social Democratic Party; Free Democratic Party
- Status in legislature: Majority (coalition); 56 / 97 (58%)
- Opposition parties: Alternative for Germany; The Left; Alliance 90/The Greens

History
- Election: 2021 Saxony-Anhalt state election
- Legislature term: 8th Landtag of Saxony-Anhalt
- Predecessor: Second Haseloff cabinet
- Successor: Schulze cabinet

The Third Haseloff cabinet was the state government of Saxony-Anhalt, sworn in on 16 September 2021 after Reiner Haseloff was elected as Minister-President of Saxony-Anhalt by the members of the Landtag of Saxony-Anhalt. It was the 10th Cabinet of Saxony-Anhalt.

It was formed after the 2021 Saxony-Anhalt state election by the Christian Democratic Union (CDU), Social Democratic Party (SPD), and Free Democratic Party (FDP). Excluding the Minister-President, the cabinet comprises nine ministers. Six are members of the CDU, two are members of the SPD, and one is a member of the FDP.

== Formation ==
The previous cabinet was a coalition government of the CDU, SPD, and Greens led by Minister-President Reiner Haseloff.

The election took place on 6 June 2021, and resulted in a substantial swing toward to CDU, while the SPD recorded small losses and the Greens slight gains. The opposition AfD and The Left also suffered losses, while the FDP re-entered the Landtag with 6%.

Overall, the incumbent coalition increased its majority; the CDU and SPD alone held a one-seat majority. The CDU announced that they would seek exploratory talks with the SPD, Greens, and FDP. The Greens ruled out renewing the outgoing government on the basis that their involvement was no longer mathematically necessary. The FDP initially rejected a coalition with the CDU and SPD on the same grounds, but recanted their position two days after the election and stated they were open to talks.

Exploratory discussions began on 21 June with a meeting between the CDU and SPD. By 2 July, the CDU and FDP had come to an agreement on a number of points, and stated that they were seeking a third partner for a coalition. The CDU also noted that they had found difficulties during talks with the Greens, and wished for another meeting with the SPD.

On 7 July, the CDU, SPD, and FDP announced their intention to begin coalition negotiations together. After some debate, on 16 July the SPD party congress gave their approval for the party to commence negotiations. They began on 19 July and concluded with a 15-hour meeting on 6 August, at which the parties finalised their coalition contract and agreed to present it on the 9th.

The CDU and SPD both held membership ballots to approve the pact. The SPD announced their results on 4 September, with 63.4% of members approving the coalition on 60.4% turnout. The CDU announced on 10 September that their membership had voted 92.1% in favour; the FDP party congress also passed the contract later that evening with 98% approval from delegates. It was formally signed on 13 September.

Reiner Haseloff was elected Minister-President by the Landtag on 16 September after two rounds of voting. He unexpectedly lost the first ballot, receiving 48 votes in favour to 49 against, with no abstentions. On the second ballot, he was elected with 53 votes in favour to 43 against and one abstention.

Minister-President election
Ballot →	16 September 2021	
Required majority →	49 out of 97	49 out of 97
Reiner Haseloff	48 / 97	53 / 97
Against	49 / 97	43 / 97
Abstentions	0 / 97	1 / 97

== Composition ==
Portfolio	Minister	Party	Took office	Left office	State secretaries
Minister-President	Reiner Haseloff born 19 February 1954 (age 72)	CDU	16 September 2021	27 January 2026	
Acting Minister-President	Armin Willingmann born 13 January 1963 (age 63)	SPD	27 January 2026	28 January 2026	
First Deputy Minister-President Minister for Science, Energy, Climate Protection and Environment	Armin Willingmann born 13 January 1963 (age 63)	SPD	16 September 2021	28 January 2026	Thomas Wünsch (Science); Steffen Eichner (Environment)
Second Deputy Minister-President Minister for Infrastructure and Digital Affairs	Lydia Hüskens born 26 March 1964 (age 62)	FDP	16 September 2021	28 January 2026	Sven Haller (Infrastructure); Bernd Schlömer (Digital Affairs, Chief information officer)
Minister for Labour, Social Affairs, Health and Equality	Petra Grimm-Benne born 27 April 1962 (age 64)	SPD	16 September 2021	28 January 2026	Beate Bröcker (Departement Chief) (Until 31 December 2021); Wolfgang Beck (Departement Chief) (Since 1 January 2022); Susi Möbbeck (Integration)
Head of the Chancellery	Rainer Robra born 15 October 1951 (age 74)	CDU	16 September 2021	28 January 2026	Federal and European Affairs, Representative to the Federal Government: Michael Schneider (Until 30 September 2022); Simone Großner (Since 1 October 2022)
Minister for Culture	Rainer Robra born 15 October 1951 (age 74)	CDU	16 September 2021	28 January 2026	Sebastian Putz (Culture); Jürgen Ude (Structural Change and Large-scale Settlements) (Since 3 May 2022)
Minister for Interior and Sport	Tamara Zieschang born 21 August 1970 (age 56)	CDU	16 September 2021	28 January 2026	Anne Poggemann (Until 1 October 2021); Klaus Zimmermann (Since 1 October 2021)
Minister for Economics, Tourism, Agriculture and Forests	Sven Schulze born 31 July 1979 (age 47)	CDU	16 September 2021	28 January 2026	Jürgen Ude (Until 3 May 2022); Stefanie Pötzsch (Since 3 May 2022); Gert Zender (Departement Chief)
Minister for Finance	Michael Richter born 27 June 1954 (age 72)	CDU	16 September 2021	28 January 2026	Rüdiger Malter (Department Chief); Klaus Klang (Until 31 January 2022)
Minister for Education	Jan Riedel born 8 June 1982 (age 44)	CDU	29 June 2025	28 January 2026	Frank Diesener (Until 15 June 2023); Jürgen Bohm (Since 11 July 2023)
Minister for Education	Eva Feußner born 12 March 1963 (age 63)	CDU	16 September 2021	29 June 2025	Frank Diesener (Until 15 June 2023); Jürgen Bohm (Since 11 July 2023)
Minister for Justice and Consumer Protection	Franziska Weidinger born 8 October 1976 (age 49)	CDU	16 September 2021	28 January 2026	Josef Molkenbur (Until 30 April 2022); Steffen Eckold (Since 1 May 2022)
