= Borna =

Borna may refer to:

== People ==
- Borna (given name), a Croatian masculine given name
- Borna (duke), the Duke of the Duchy of Littoral Croatia (Dalmatian Croatia) c. 810–821, a vassal of the Frankish Empire
- Bertin Borna (1930–2007), a Beninese politician

== Places ==
- Borna, Leipzig, a town in Saxony, Germany
- Borna, Bahretal, a subdivision of the Bahretal municipality, Saxony, Germany
- Borna Dam, an earthfill dam on Borna river near Ambejogai, Beed district, Maharashtra, India

== Other uses ==
- Borna disease, an infectious neurological syndrome
  - Bornaviridae, a family of viruses associated with Borna disease
  - Borna disease virus
- Borna language (Democratic Republic of the Congo), a spurious language description now retired from ISO 639-3
- Borna language (Ethiopia), a North Omotic language spoken in western Ethiopia
- Borna snakehead, Channa amphibeus, an extremely rare species of snakehead fish

== See also ==
- Boma (disambiguation)
- Borne (disambiguation)
