= Weidinger =

Weidinger is a surname. Notable people with the surname include:

- Alexander Weidinger (born 1997), German professional footballer
- Andreas Weidinger (born 1970), German composer, producer, conductor, and arranger for film, television and records
- Andreas Weidinger (politician) (born 1992), Danish politician and entrepreneur
- Andrew Weidinger (born 1982), American football coach
- Anton Weidinger (1766–1852), Austrian trumpeter
- Christine Weidinger (born 1946), American operatic soprano
- Franziska Weidinger (born 1976), German politician
- Otto Weidinger (1914–1990), SS commander in Nazi Germany
- Josef "Joschi" Weidinger (1923–2002), Austrian boxer
- Morgan Weidinger (born 1998), American artist
