= Avian bornavirus =

Avian bornaviruses

Scientific classification
- (unranked): Virus
- Realm: Riboviria
- Kingdom: Orthornavirae
- Phylum: Negarnaviricota
- Class: Monjiviricetes
- Order: Mononegavirales
- Family: Bornaviridae
- Genus: Orthobornavirus

Groups included
- Orthobornavirus serini; Orthobornavirus estrildidae; Orthobornavirus alphapsittaciforme; Orthobornavirus betapsittaciforme; Orthobornavirus avisaquaticae

Cladistically included but traditionally excluded taxa
- Other orthobornaviruses

Species of virus

Avian bornaviruses are a group of RNA viruses that may cause disease, particularly proventricular dilatation disease (PDD), in infected birds that develop autoimmunity and inflammation of neural ganglia. A number of species have been sequenced from infected parrots, passerines, waterfowl, and shorebirds. The viruses fall under the genus Orthobornavirus in the family Bornaviridae, which also contains non-avian bornaviruses.

== Discovery ==
In 2008, by pyrosequencing of cDNA from the brains of several parrots suffering from PDD, Honkavuori et al. identified the presence of a novel bornavirus.

Using real time PCR, the investigators confirmed the presence of this virus in the brains and proventriculus of three cases of PDD, and its absence in four unaffected birds. At approximately the same time, Kistler and her colleagues used a microarray approach to identify a bornavirus hybridization signature in three out of five PDD cases but not in eight control parrots.

== Recovery and naming ==
Using high-throughput pyrosequencing in combination with conventional PCR cloning and sequencing, these investigators recovered the complete viral genome sequence and named this virus "avian bornavirus". Today, several distinct avian bornaviruses are distinguished. In general these viruses show only about 65% sequence identity with mammalian Borna disease virus 1 (BoDV-1).

== Taxonomy ==
Family Bornaviridae: bornaviruses
| Genus | Species | Virus (Abbreviation) |
| Orthobornavirus | Orthobornavirus serini | canary bornavirus 1 (CnBV-1) |
| Orthobornavirus | Orthobornavirus serini | canary bornavirus 2 (CnBV-2) |
| Orthobornavirus | Orthobornavirus serini | canary bornavirus 3 (CnBV-3)) |
| Orthobornavirus | Orthobornavirus estrildidae | estrildid finch bornavirus 1 (EsBV-1) |
| Orthobornavirus | Orthobornavirus alphapsittaciforme | parrot bornavirus 1 (PaBV-1) |
| Orthobornavirus | Orthobornavirus alphapsittaciforme | parrot bornavirus 2 (PaBV-2) |
| Orthobornavirus | Orthobornavirus alphapsittaciforme | parrot bornavirus 3 (PaBV-3) |
| Orthobornavirus | Orthobornavirus alphapsittaciforme | parrot bornavirus 4 (PaBV-4) |
| Orthobornavirus | Orthobornavirus alphapsittaciforme | parrot bornavirus 7 (PaBV-7) |
| Orthobornavirus | Orthobornavirus betapsittaciforme | parrot bornavirus 5 (PaBV-5) |
| Orthobornavirus | Orthobornavirus avisaquaticae | aquatic bird bornavirus 1 (ABBV-1) |
| Orthobornavirus | Orthobornavirus avisaquaticae | aquatic bird bornavirus 2 (ABBV-2) |

== Structure ==
The overall structure of the bornaviral genome is well conserved. Thus the number and order of genes is unchanged as is the structure of transcription initiation and termination sites. Rinder and her colleagues have shown that avian bornaviruses apparently lack a 22-nucleotide fragment that serves a regulatory function for the genes coding for viral proteins X and P.

== Further research ==
Some cultured avian bornaviruses induce typical PDD in Patagonian conures (Cyanoliseus patagonus) with a typical interval of 55–60 days between infection and death. Gancz and his colleagues showed that inoculation of parrot bornavirus 4-infected brain tissue will also induce typical disease in cockatiels (Nymphicus hollandicus) after 60–95 days. Ongoing studies suggest that the virus is spread by the fecal-oral route but it is also possible that respiratory and vertical spread also occur. A 230-day experimental infection of cockatiels, resulted in 5 of 18 inoculated birds (3 infected iv - intravenously, and 2 infected ic - intracerebrally) showing clinical signs typical of PDD. Psittacines Iv1 and iv3 had gastrointestinal signs and birds ic1 and iv5 had neurologic signs. One cockatiel infected ic had gastrointestinal and neurologic signs. In one psittacine given ABV intracerebrally, clinical signs developed on the 33rd, 37th, and 41st dpi, with, respectively, non-specific signs, such as apathy; undigested feed (seeds) in feces; and epileptic seizures. In two psittacines infected iv, the gastrointestinal signs were apparent on day 116 or 126 post infection. In two birds given ABV iv, the neurological signs started on days 159 or 199 dpi.

== Another point of view on ABV and PDD ==
Avian bornaviruses have been reported, yet not proven, as the cause of proventricular dilatation disease (PDD), a disease of pet parrots. While a report of research using a 'positive' brain cell culture (confirmed to contain an avian bornavirus) from a psittacine (parrot) that died with confirmed histopathological diagnosis of PDD (mononuclear infiltrative ganglioneuritis). In this study this 'positive' inoculant was used to infect another parrot. This resulted in the inoculated bird's death and the subsequent histopathological diagnosis of PDD. This research does not fulfil the four criteria points known as Koch's postulate to establish a causal relationship between a causative microbe and a disease. Other research with an inoculant derived from birds with ABV-only infections (with no PDD histopathological changes) did not develop any signs of PDD. These birds were carefully monitored over extended periods, well exceeding the documented 90-day inoculation period for PDD, yet failed to show any signs of PDD. However, the differences in responses to the experimental infections may be associated to ABV strain variation in pathogenicity, the chronic nature of the infection and the difficulty in standardizing the experimental hosts.
