= Jan Riedel =

German politician (born 1982)

Minister of Education of Saxony-Anhalt
- Incumbent
- Assumed office 29 July 2025
- Minister-President: Reiner Haseloff; Sven Schulze
- Preceded by: Eva Feußner

Personal details
- Born: 8 June 1982 (age 43) Borna
- Party: Christian Democratic Union (since 2021)

Jan Riedel (born 8 June 1982 in Borna) is a German politician serving as minister of education of Saxony-Anhalt since 2025. He has been a city councillor of Halle (Saale) since 2024, and served as speaker of the city council from 2024 to 2025.
