= ABV (disambiguation) =

ABV may refer to:

- Aachener Bachverein, choir in Germany
- ABV (TV station), the Australian Broadcasting Corporation's Melbourne TV station
- Alcohol by volume, a measure of the alcohol content of alcoholic drinks
- Appendix Barberino-Vaticana, one of the syllogae minores of the Greek Anthology
- Assault breacher vehicle, a military vehicle
- Avian bornavirus, a virus
- Bahrani Arabic, ISO 639-3 language code
- Alternative for Bulgarian Revival (Алтернатива за българско възраждане, АБВ/ABV), political party in Bulgaria
- Nnamdi Azikiwe International Airport in Abuja, Federal Capital Territory, Nigeria (IATA airport code ABV)
