= Mady Hornig =

American psychiatrist

- Born: 1957 (age 68–69); Brooklyn
- Education: Cornell University, The New School, Medical College of Pennsylvania
- Known for: Research into autism and the PANDAS hypothesis
- Scientific career
- Fields: Biological psychiatry, epidemiology
- Workplaces: Mailman School of Public Health
- Website: https://web.archive.org/web/20121220210727/http://cii.columbia.edu/team.aspx?l8psqK&cid=FclJsq

Mady Hornig (born 1957) is an American psychiatrist and an associate professor of epidemiology at Columbia University's Mailman School of Public Health. A physician-scientist, her research involves clinical, epidemiological, and animal model research on autism and related neurodevelopmental conditions. She directs the clinical core of an international investigation of the role of Borna disease virus in human mental illness and participates as a key investigator for the Autism Birth Cohort (ABC) project, a large prospective epidemiological study, based in Norway, that is identifying how genes and timing interact with environmental agents preceding the onset of autism spectrum diagnoses. In 2006, she was appointed as guest professor at the school of basic medical science of Beijing University in Beijing, China.

Hornig has been described as an "anti-mercury activist". Along with CII director W. Ian Lipkin and colleague Thomas Briese, she is currently investigating measles virus RNA sequences in bowel biopsies of children with autism spectrum disorders. Formulating a "three strikes" model of causation that integrates genetics, the environment and developmental neurobiology, Hornig posits that some cases of autism may represent the unfortunate coincidence of genetic vulnerability (first dimension) and exposure to environmental factors (second dimension) at a critical period of brain development (third dimension). She is examining how brain damage from infections, immune system dysfunction, neurotoxins, and other chemical or psychosocial stress factors, or host responses to these environmental agents, can lead to neurodevelopmental and other central nervous system disorders, thereby contributing to autism, schizophrenia, attention deficit hyperactivity disorder, obsessive compulsive disorders, and mood disorders.

== Education ==
Hornig received a bachelor's degree in 1978 from Cornell University, where she was a College Scholar; an MA in psychology in 1983 from the New School for Social Research, and an MD in 1988 from the Medical College of Pennsylvania, in Philadelphia. Between 1988 and 1992, Hornig served her residency in psychiatry at the University of Vermont. Under a National Research Service Award from the National Institutes of Mental Health, she completed a postdoctoral fellowship in neuropsychopharmacology on the Depression Research Unit of the University of Pennsylvania from 1992 to 1994.

== Career ==
In the 1990s, Hornig investigated the potential link between the Borna virus and depression in humans.

Hornig has been described as being part of an "inner circle of anti-mercury activists" whose work has been funded in part by the anti-mercury campaigning group SafeMinds.

In 2008, she published a study concluding that there was no association between presence of measles vaccine virus in the gut of children and whether these children had autism, nor was there an association between MMR exposure and autism.

In 2011, she co-authored another study concluding that autistic children have altered expression of genes involved in digestion. Regarding this study, Hornig said that its results "are consistent with other research suggesting that autism may be a system-wide disorder, and provide insight into why changes in diet or the use of antibiotics may help alleviate symptoms in some children".

In 2015, Hornig co-authored a study that found that chronic fatigue syndrome (CFS) in the early stages of the disease had higher levels of cytokines than people without CFS.

== Animal models ==
In the 1990s, Hornig helped to develop an infection-based model of neurodevelopmental disorders, such as autism and depression, based on neonatal rat infection with Borna disease virus.

In 2004, Hornig published a controversial paper concluding that, in a highly inbred strain of mice which is unusually susceptible to autoimmune disease, administration of thimerosal resulted in the development of autism-like symptoms; specifically, "growth delay; reduced locomotion; exaggerated response to novelty; and densely packed, hyperchromic hippocampal neurons with altered glutamate receptors and transporters". In addition, in an interview with the Los Angeles Times, Hornig contended that thimerosal may be linked to the recent increases in the incidence of autism. However, Paul Offit has accused Hornig of overstating her findings, arguing that her study was "a far cry from proving that thimerosal caused autism in children", and Steven Goodman, a member of the IOM panel that rejected a thimerosal-autism link in 2004, shortly before Hornig's study was published, has claimed that this study "in no way substitutes for actual human evidence". Additionally, researchers from the University of California, Davis were unable to reproduce Hornig's results despite using the same strain of mice and ten times the amount of mercury used in Hornig's study.

In 2006, Dan Olmsted reported that Hornig was working on a treatment program in which she would administer gold salts to these genetically susceptible mice in an attempt to improve their behavior.

In 2009, Hornig published another study using mice to examine the mechanism by which Group A beta-hemolytic streptococcus infections might cause Tourette's syndrome, OCD and tics, in line with the PANDAS hypothesis. Hornig stated that her findings "illustrate that antibodies alone are sufficient to trigger this behavioral syndrome".

== Personal life ==
Hornig is a native of Brooklyn born 1957. She married Jim Hornig-Rohan in 1979. They met at the Cancer Institute of Harvard Medical School, when both were doing research in immunology. They have a child, who was born in July 1985.

== Select publications ==
- Steven Locke, Mady Hornig-Rohan, Mind and Immunity: Behavioral Immunology, 1983, ISBN 0-275-91400-3
- Jay D. Amsterdam, Mady Hornig, Andrew A. Nierenberg (editors), Treatment-Resistant Mood Disorders, 2001, ISBN 0-521-59341-7
- Hornig M., Chian D., Lipkin W.I., 'Neurotoxic effects of postnatal thimerosal are mouse strain dependent', Molecular Psychiatry (September, 2004)
- Cox-Foster, D. L.; Conlan, S.; Holmes, E. C.; Palacios, G.; Evans, J. D.; Moran, N. A.; Quan, P. -L.; Briese, T.; Hornig, M.; Geiser, D. M.; Martinson, V.; Vanengelsdorp, D.; Kalkstein, A. L.; Drysdale, A.; Hui, J.; Zhai, J.; Cui, L.; Hutchison, S. K.; Simons, J. F.; Egholm, M.; Pettis, J. S.; Lipkin, W. I. (2007). "A Metagenomic Survey of Microbes in Honey Bee Colony Collapse Disorder". Science. 318 (5848): 283–287. Bibcode:2007Sci...318..283C. doi:10.1126/science.1146498. PMID 17823314. S2CID 14013425.
- Mady Hornig, Thomas Briese, Timothy Buie, Margaret L. Bauman, Gregory Lauwers, Ulrike Siemetzki, Kimberly Hummel, Paul A. Rota, William J. Bellini, John J. O'Leary, Orla Sheils, Errol Alden, Larry Pickering, W. Ian Lipkin - 'Lack of Association between Measles Virus Vaccine and Autism with Enteropathy: A Case-Control Study', PLoS ONE (September, 2008)
