= Woltersdorf =

Woltersdorf may refer to the following places in Germany:

- Woltersdorf, Brandenburg, in the Oder-Spree district, Brandenburg
- Woltersdorf, Lower Saxony, in the Lüchow-Dannenberg district, Lower Saxony
- Woltersdorf, Schleswig-Holstein, in the Lauenburg district, Schleswig-Holstein
- Woltersdorf, Saxony-Anhalt, in the Jerichower Land district, Saxony-Anhalt
- Woltersdorf, Wittenberg, in the Wittenberg district, Saxony-Anhalt
- Woltersdorf, Teltow-Fläming, a part of Nuthe-Urstromtal, in the Teltow-Fläming district, Brandenburg
