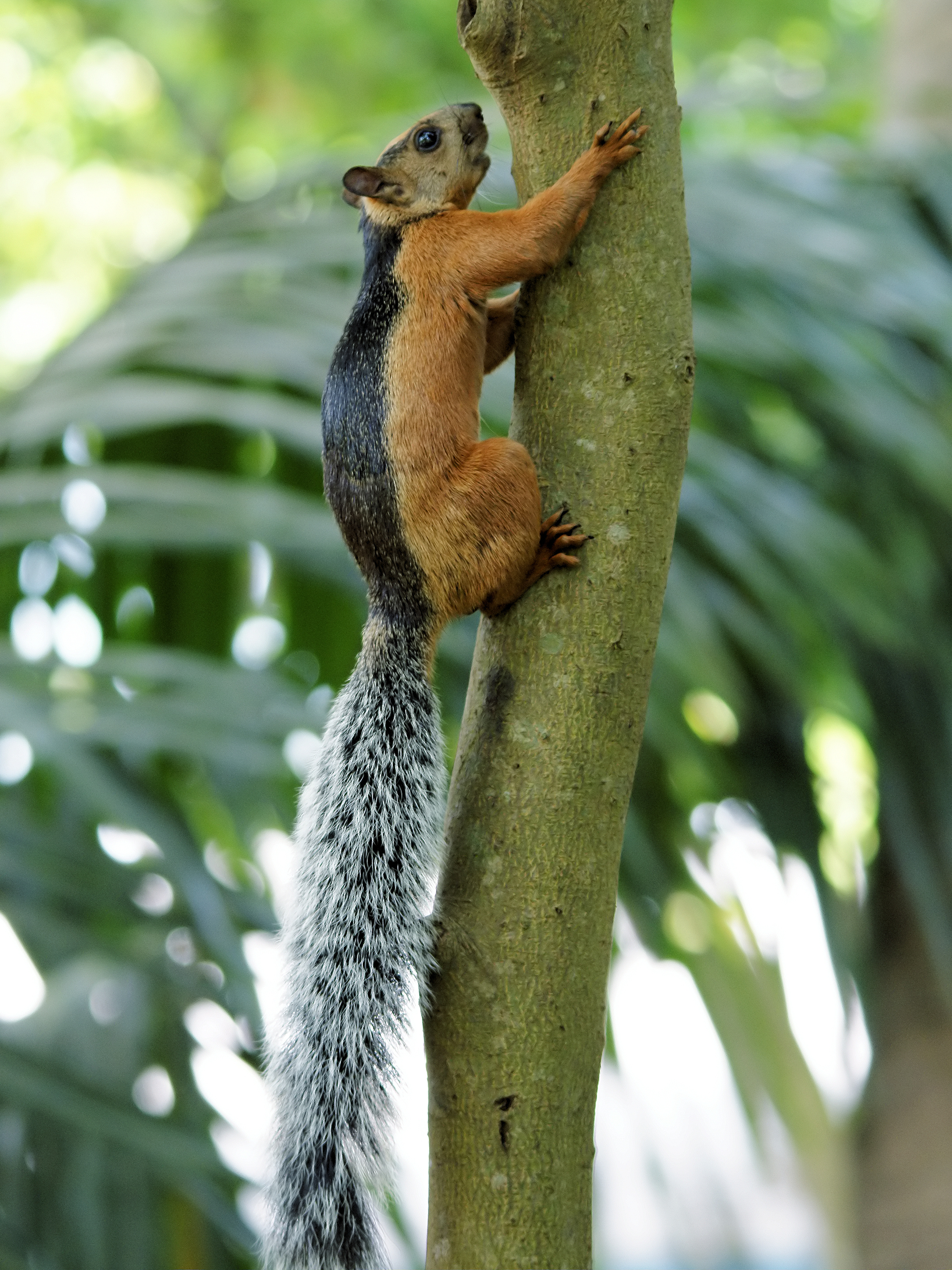
- S. v. atrirufus

Conservation status
- Least Concern (IUCN 3.1)

Scientific classification
- Kingdom: Animalia
- Phylum: Chordata
- Class: Mammalia
- Order: Rodentia
- Family: Sciuridae
- Genus: Sciurus
- Species: S. variegatoides

Binomial name
- Sciurus variegatoides Ogilby, 1839

Subspecies
- List: S. v. adolphei Lesson, 1842; S. v. atrirufus Harris, 1930; S. v. bangsi Dickey, 1928; S. v. belti Nelson, 1899; S. v. boothiae Gray, 1843; S. v. dorsalis Gray, 1849; S. v. goldmani Nelson, 1898; S. v. helveolus Goldman, 1912; S. v. loweryi McPherson, 1972; S. v. managuensis Nelson, 1898; S. v. melania Gray, 1867; S. v. rigidus Peters, 1863; S. v. thomasi Nelson, 1899; S. v. underwoodi Goldman, 1932; S. v. variegatoides Ogilby, 1839
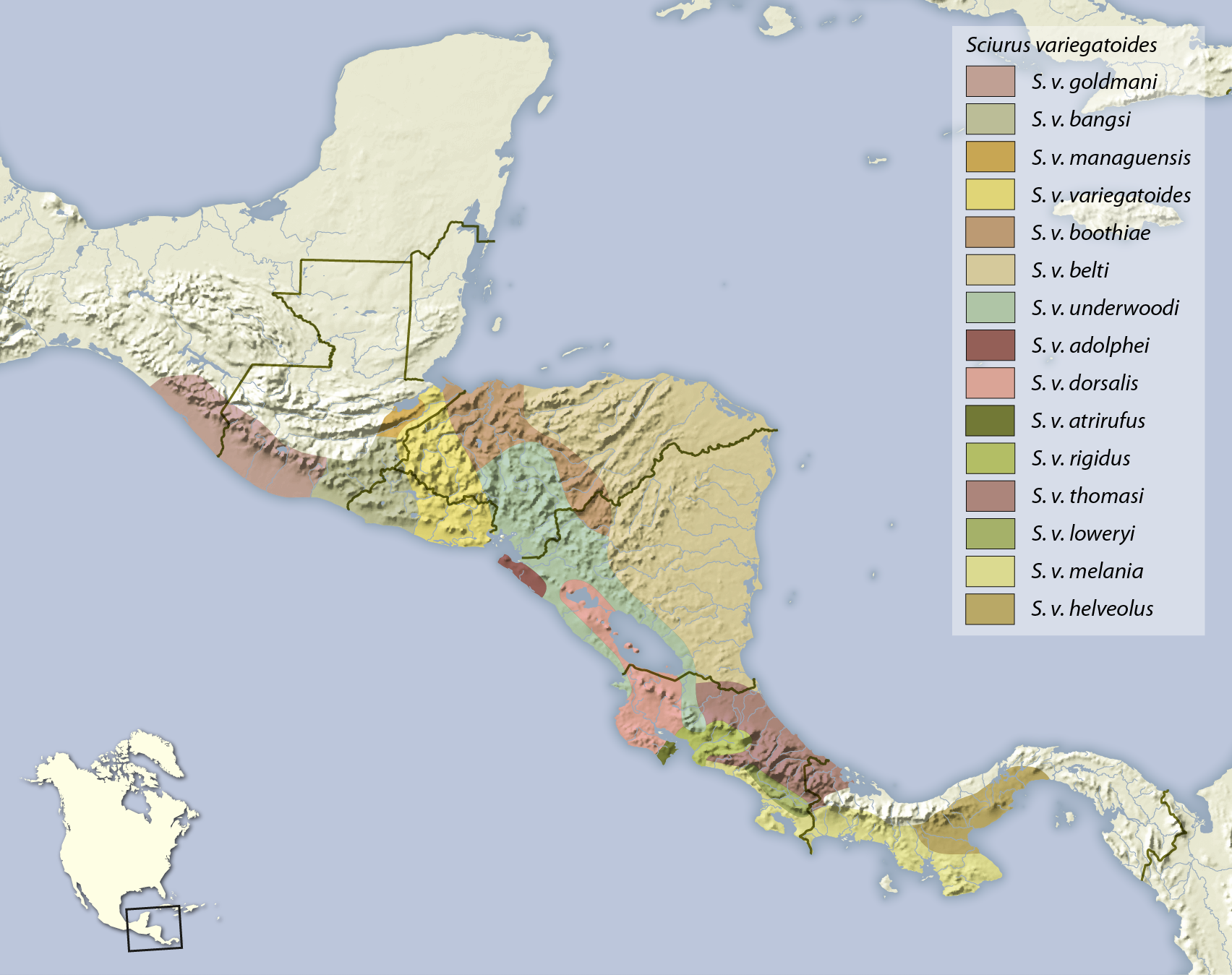
- Approximate distribution of the different subspecies

= Variegated squirrel =

Species of rodent

The variegated squirrel (Sciurus variegatoides) is a tree squirrel in the genus Sciurus found in Costa Rica, El Salvador, Guatemala, Honduras, southern Mexico, Nicaragua, and Panama. Fifteen subspecies are recognised. It is a common squirrel and the International Union for Conservation of Nature has rated it a "least-concern species". Variegated squirrels kept as pets in Germany have been implicated in the transmission of a bornavirus to humans from which three people have died.

== Description ==
The variegated squirrel is a medium-sized squirrel; the head-and-body length is about 260 mm (10.2 in) with a tail of much the same length. It weighs about 500 g (18 oz). The several subspecies differ in appearance and there is often a considerable variation between the appearances of individuals in the same population. The dorsal colouration varies between dark brown to yellowish grey. The neck tends to be darker than other parts and there is often a paler patch behind the ears. The underparts are usually some shade of cinnamon. The tail is long and densely bushy; in Mexico it is black, sometimes with white tips to the hairs giving it a frosted appearance. In Nicaragua and Costa Rica, some individuals have pale underparts and tails.

== Distribution and habitat ==
This squirrel is native to Central America, its range extending from Mexico southwards through Guatemala, Honduras, El Salvador, Nicaragua, Costa Rica and Panama. Habitats in which it occurs include both dry deciduous forest and evergreen forest, secondary growth, and plantations, and it can become a crop pest. It is mainly a lowland squirrel, ranging up to an altitude of 1,800 m (5,910 ft), or somewhat higher in Costa Rica.

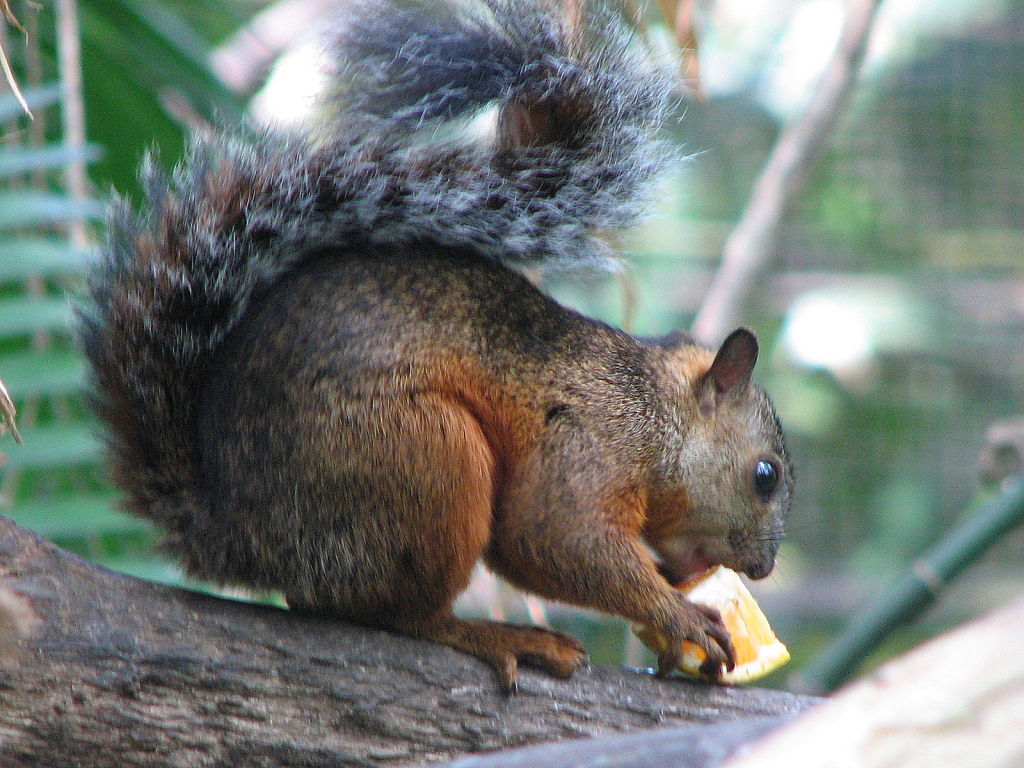
S. v. rigidus in San José, Costa Rica

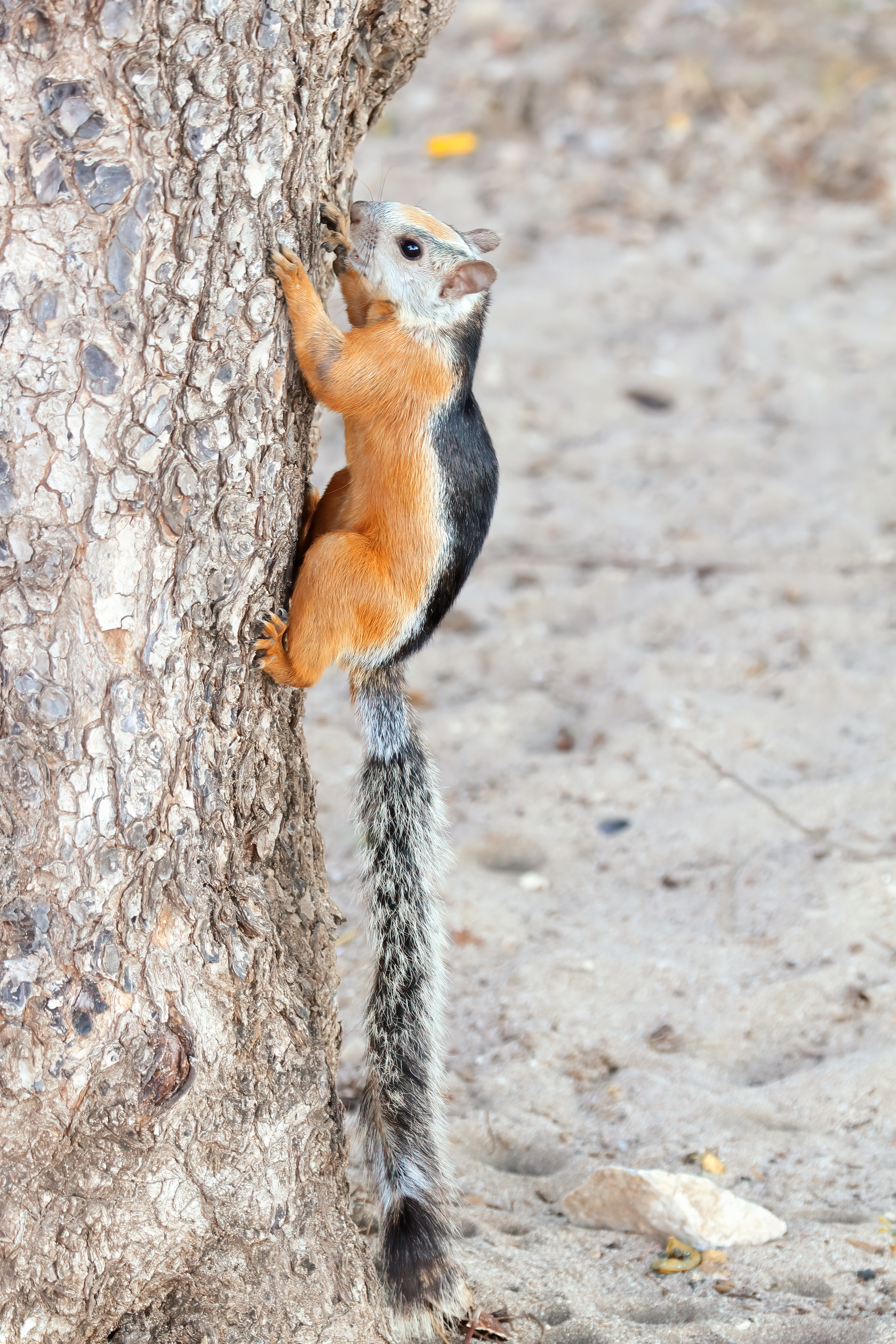
S. v. atrirufus in Tamarindo, Costa Rica

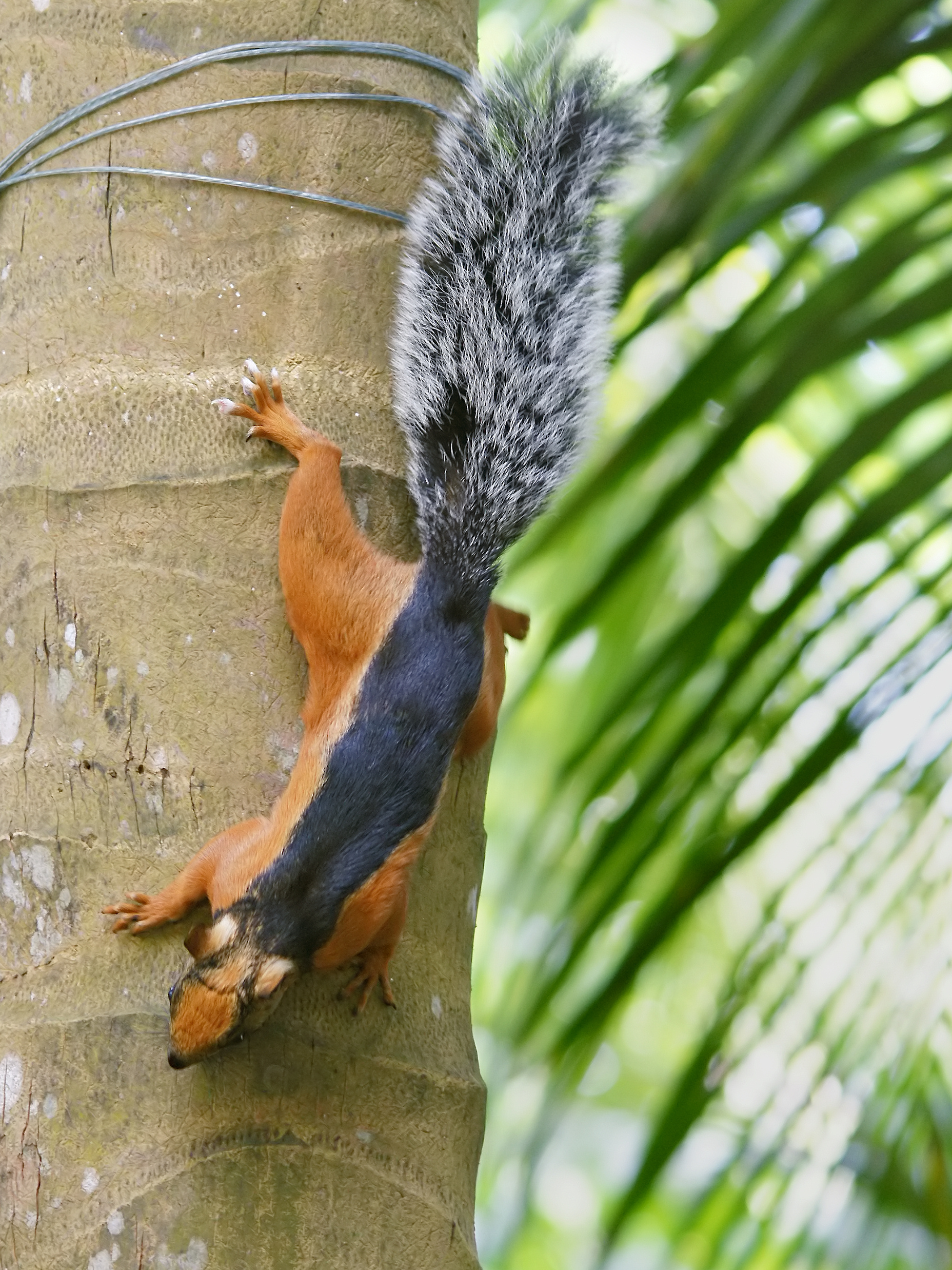
S. v. atrirufus in Montezuma, Nicoya Peninsula, Costa Rica

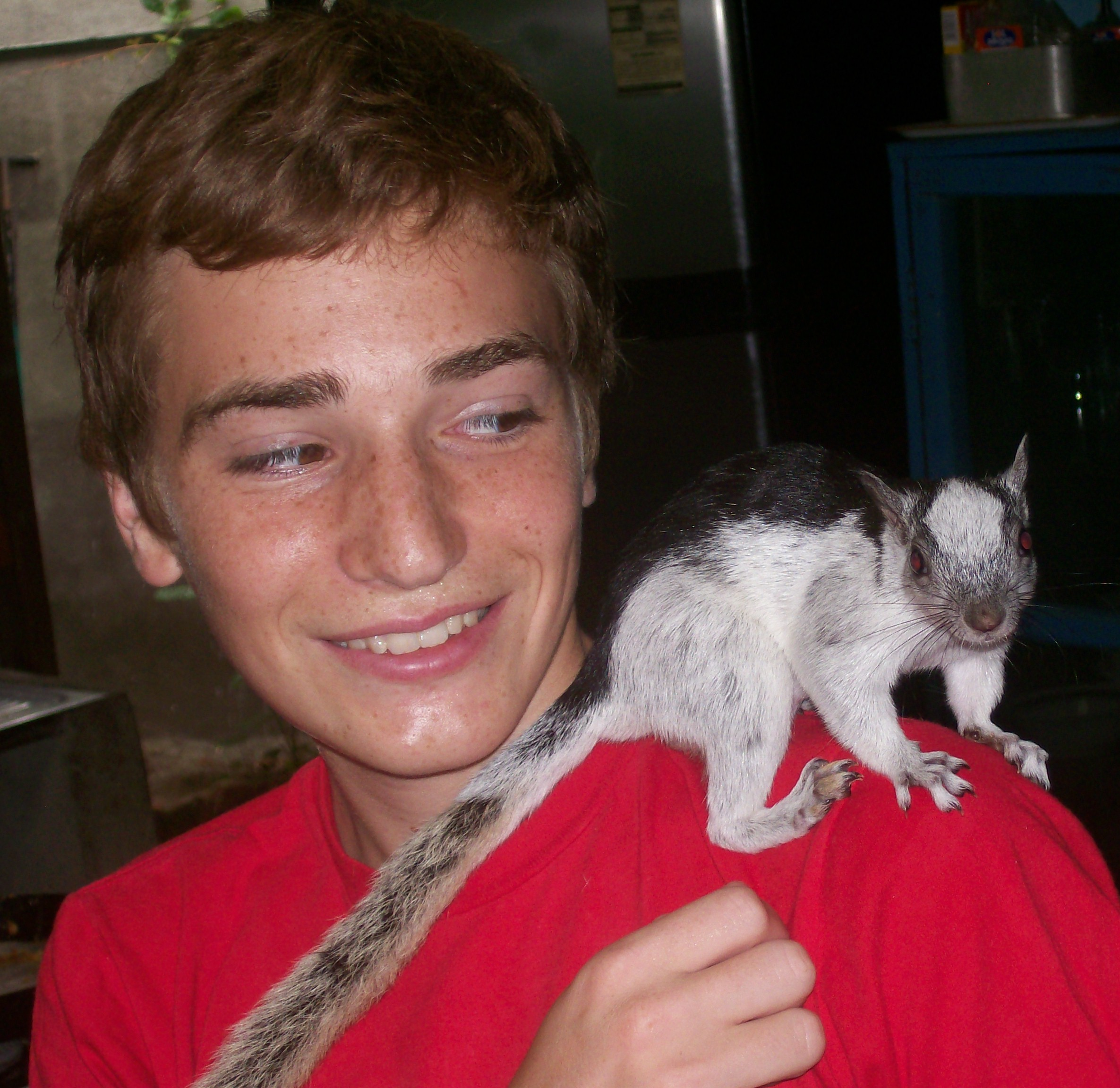
S. v. dorsalis rescued from the pet trade, raised in Estacion Biologica, Laguna de Apoyo Nature Reserve, Nicaragua, and returned to the wild

== Ecology ==
The species is diurnal and seldom descends to the ground; it spends the night in a nest it builds which is sometimes in a hole in a tree but more often is constructed of leaves and built in the fork of a branch close to the trunk. This squirrel is primarily a seed-eater, but also consumes fruits and some animal matter in the form of insects and nestlings. It tends to avoid hard shelled seeds but does consume acorns. Unlike some other squirrels in colder climates, it does not hoard food and therefore plays little part in the dispersal of seeds.

== Status ==
S. variegatoides has a wide range and is a common species. No particular threats have been identified and the population seems steady, so the International Union for Conservation of Nature has rated its conservation status as "least concern".

== Bornavirus ==
In 2015, a bornavirus now known as "variegated squirrel 1 bornavirus" (VSBV-1) was detected in some variegated squirrels kept as pets in eastern Germany. Three squirrel breeders who lived in this region and associated with each other, died over a two-year period from a progressive encephalitis caused by a novel virus. Research into the causes of their illness and deaths implicated the variegated squirrel as a carrier of the virus, with a genomic study identifying a new virus similar to mammalian 1 bornavirus in the liver, kidney and lung of one squirrel specimen. As a result of their investigations, the researchers concluded that in all three human fatalities, VSBV-1 was the likely causative agent. Further investigation in 2016 found more squirrels in western Germany carrying the disease. It is not clear whether the disease originated in Germany or whether the pathogen was introduced into the country through the importation of already-infected animals.
