= Armin Willingmann =

German politician

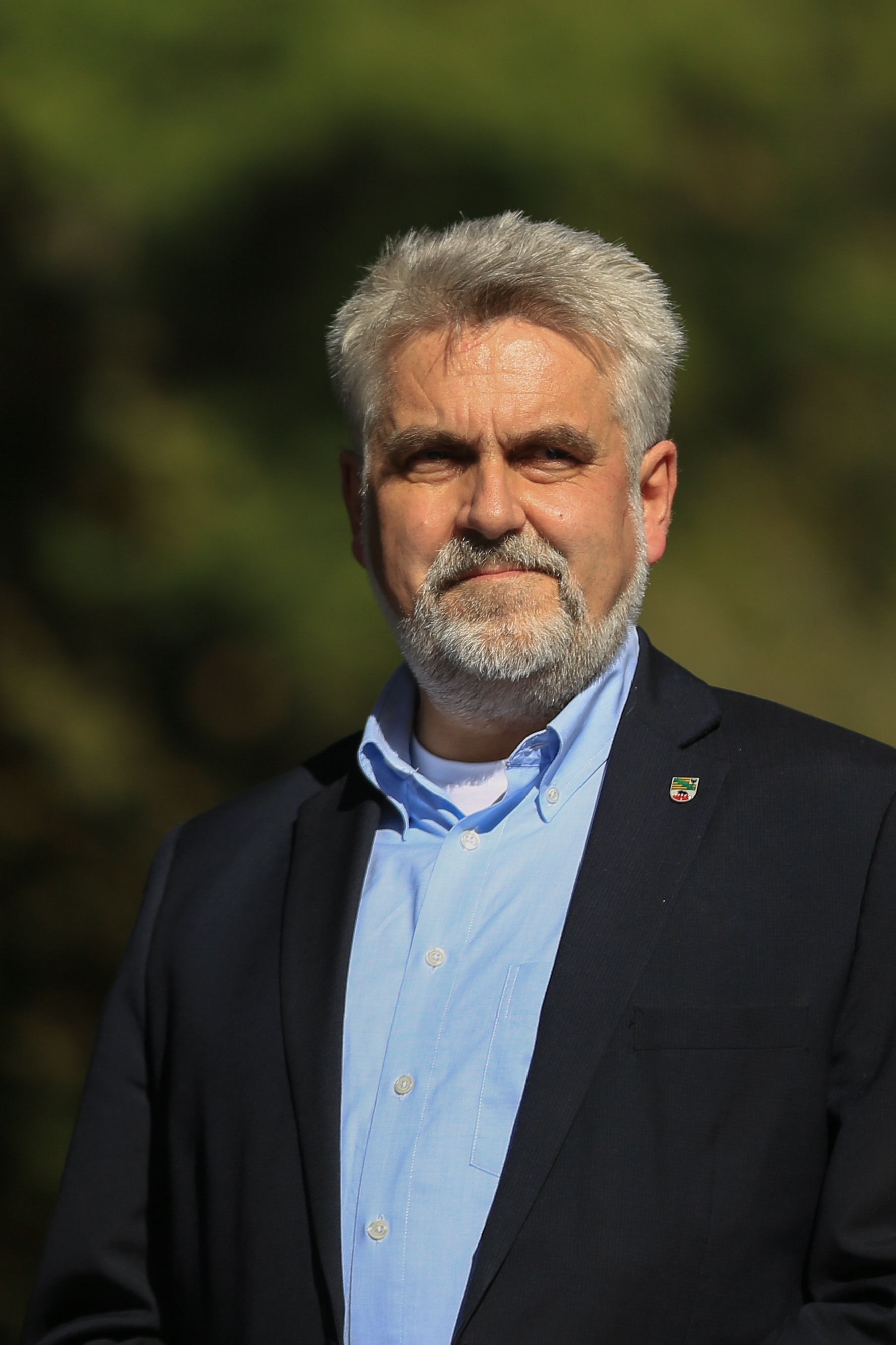

State Minister for Research, Energy, Climate Protection and the Environment of Saxony-Anhalt
- Incumbent
- Assumed office 2021
- Minister-President: Reiner Haseloff

Personal details
- Born: 13 January 1963 (age 63) Dinslaken, West Germany (now Germany)
- Party: SPD
- Education: University of Mainz; LMU Munich; University of Cologne

Armin Willingmann (born 13 January 1963) is a German legal scholar and politician of the Social Democratic Party (SPD) who has been serving as Deputy Minister-President and State Minister for Research, Energy, Climate Protection and the Environment in the government of Minister-President of Saxony-Anhalt Reiner Haseloff since 2021.

== Education and early career ==
Willingmann was born 1963 in Dinslaken and studied law, economics and history. He later served as law professor (1999–2003) and as rector (2003–2016) at the Harz University of Applied Studies.

== Political career ==
From 2016 to 2021, Willingmann served as State Minister for Economic Affairs, Research and Digitization.

Following the 2021 state elections, Willingmann became both Deputy Minister-President and State Minister for Research, Energy, Climate Protection and the Environment. In this capacity, he is also one of the state's representatives on the Bundesrat, where he serves on the Committee on Cultural Affairs; the Committee on Economic Affairs; and the Committee on the Environment, Nature Conservation and Nuclear Safety.

== Other activities ==
- Dessau-Wörlitz Garden Realm, Member of the Board of Trustees (since 2021)
- Max Planck Institute for Dynamics of Complex Technical Systems, Member of the Board of Trustees (since 2021)
- Business Forum of the Social Democratic Party of Germany, Member of the Political Advisory Board
