= Woltersdorf, Wittenberg =

Woltersdorf
- Village of Zahna-Elster
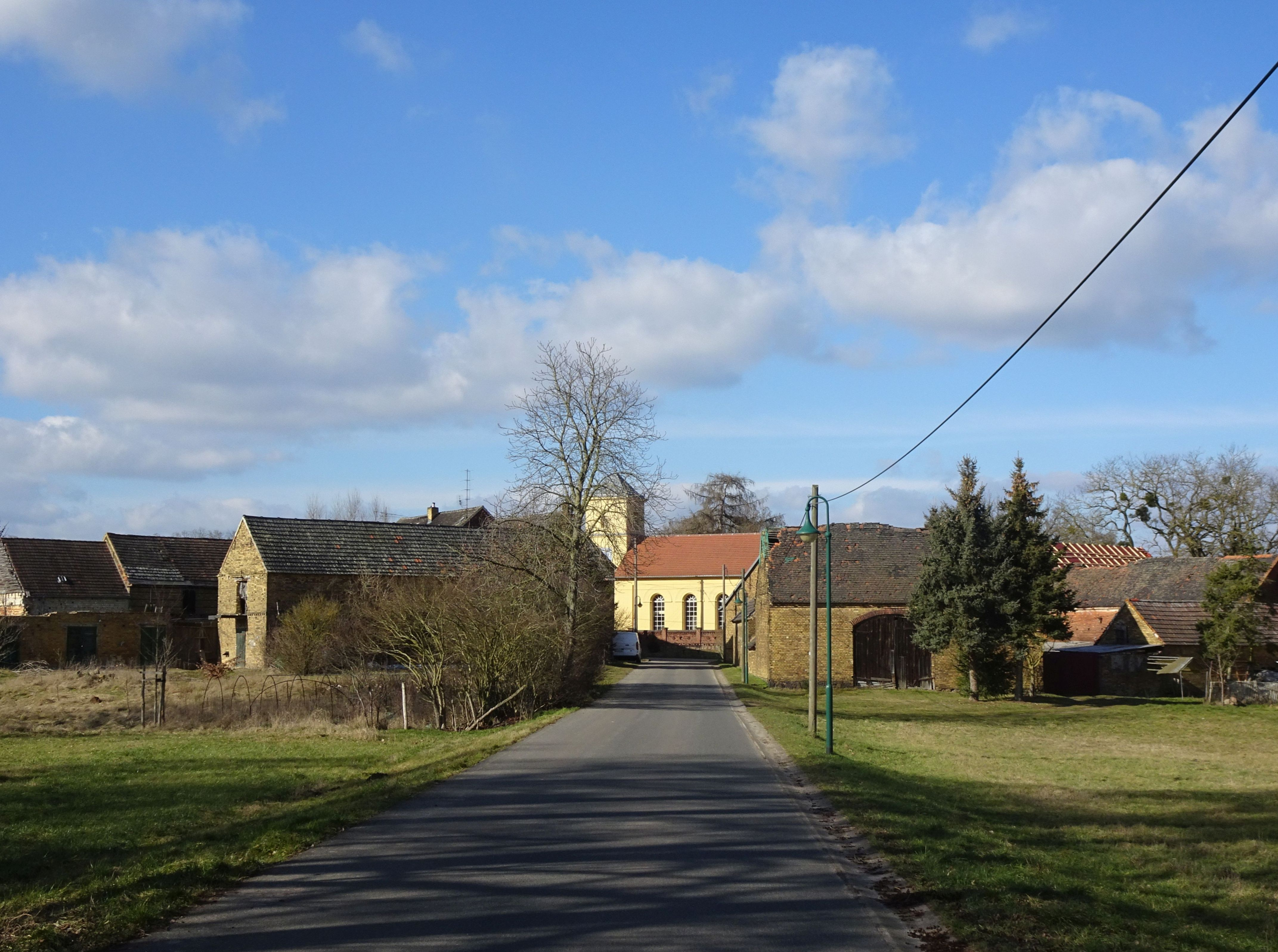
- Woltersdorf as seen from the south entrance
- Interactive map of Woltersdorf
- Location within Germany Location within Saxony-Anhalt
- Coordinates: 51°55′13″N 12°44′31″E
- Country: Germany
- State: Saxony-Anhalt
- District: Wittenberg
- City: Zahna-Elster
- Borough: Bulzig
- Elevation: 100 m (330 ft)

Population (2024-03-01)
  - Total: 24
- Time zone: UTC+01:00 (CET)
  - Summer (DST): UTC+02:00 (CEST)
- Postal codes: 06895
- Vehicle registration: WB

Woltersdorf (German pronunciation: [ˈvɔltɐsdɔʁf]) is a village in the municipality of Zahna-Elster within the Wittenberg district of Saxony-Anhalt, Germany. It is located in the administrative division (Ortsteil) and former municipality of Bülzig.

== History ==
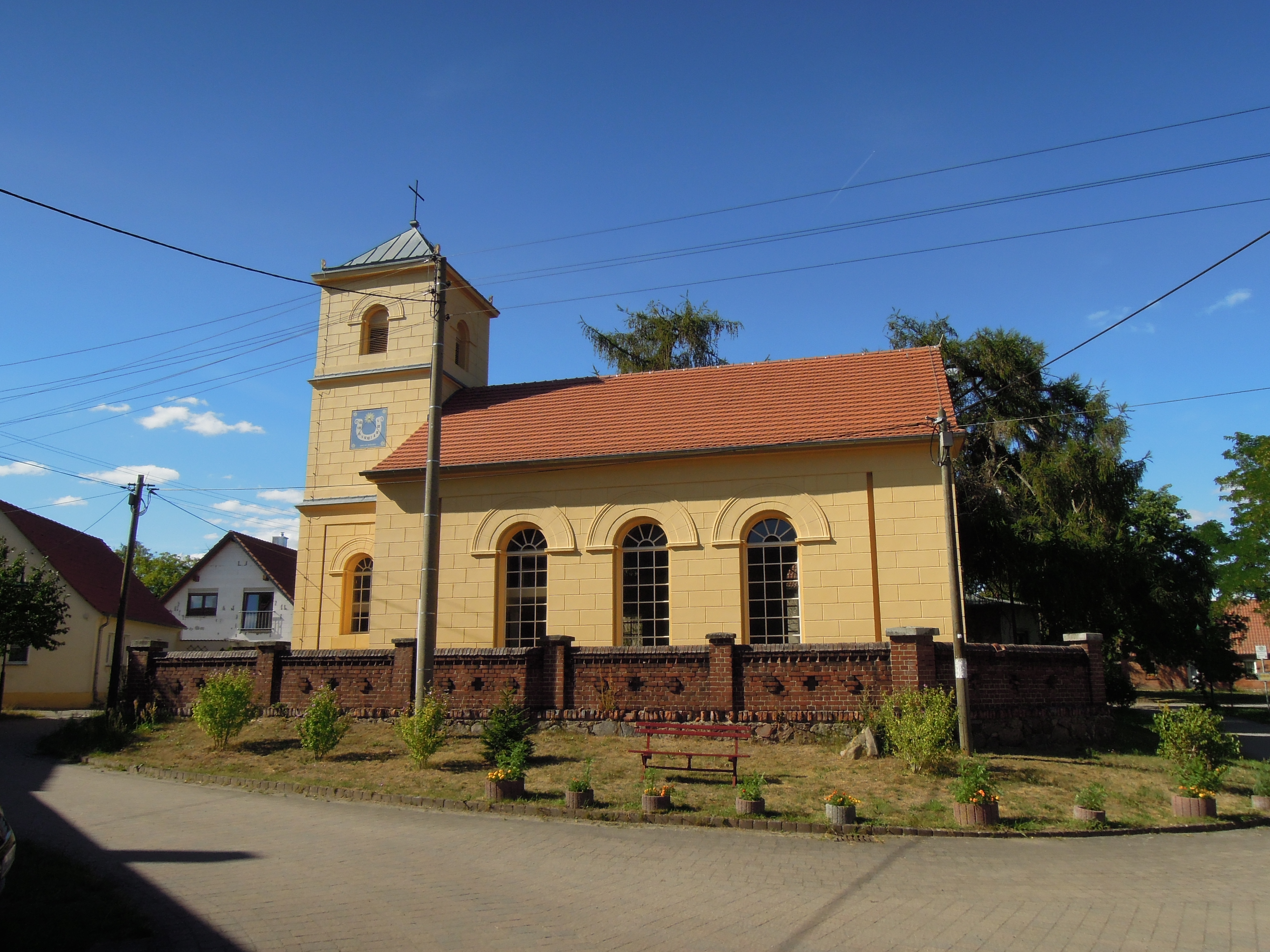
Village church

The village was first mentioned in 1190 and takes its name from its first owner, meaning 'Woter's village'. A church was first constructed in the village by 1426, it was destroyed by the Hussites in 1429 and rebuilt in 1764, soon after again being plundered and burnt down during the Napoleonic wars; the current village church was built in 1839. The village cemetery was inaugurated on 7 May 1904. No fighting happened in the village during World War II, with control being peacefully established when Soviet troops entered the village on 24 April 1945. A nearby shooting range that was used by the Soviet troops lead to accidents and fears of a possible resettlement of villagers. The municipality of Woltersdorf was annexed into the municipality of Bülzig on 1 August 1950, Bülzig was itself incorporated into Zahna-Elster in 2008.

The road (Kreisstraße K 2105) from Bülzig to Woltersdorf was the last road of its type to be paved in Wittenberg district. The newly paved road was opened on 25 July 2024.

== Demographics ==
As of 2015, 50.2% (12 people) were male and 49.8% (11 people) were female. The median age was 49.8 years.

Historical population

Year	Pop.	±%
1910	70	—
1933	60	−14.3%
1939	62	+3.3%
1975	33	−46.8%

Year	Pop.	±%
1990	39	+18.2%
2000	32	−17.9%
2015	23	−28.1%
2024	24	+4.3%

Data may be affected by territorial fluctuation.
Sources: 1910, 1933 & 1939, 1975–2015, 2024
