= Tamara Zieschang =

German politician (born 1970)

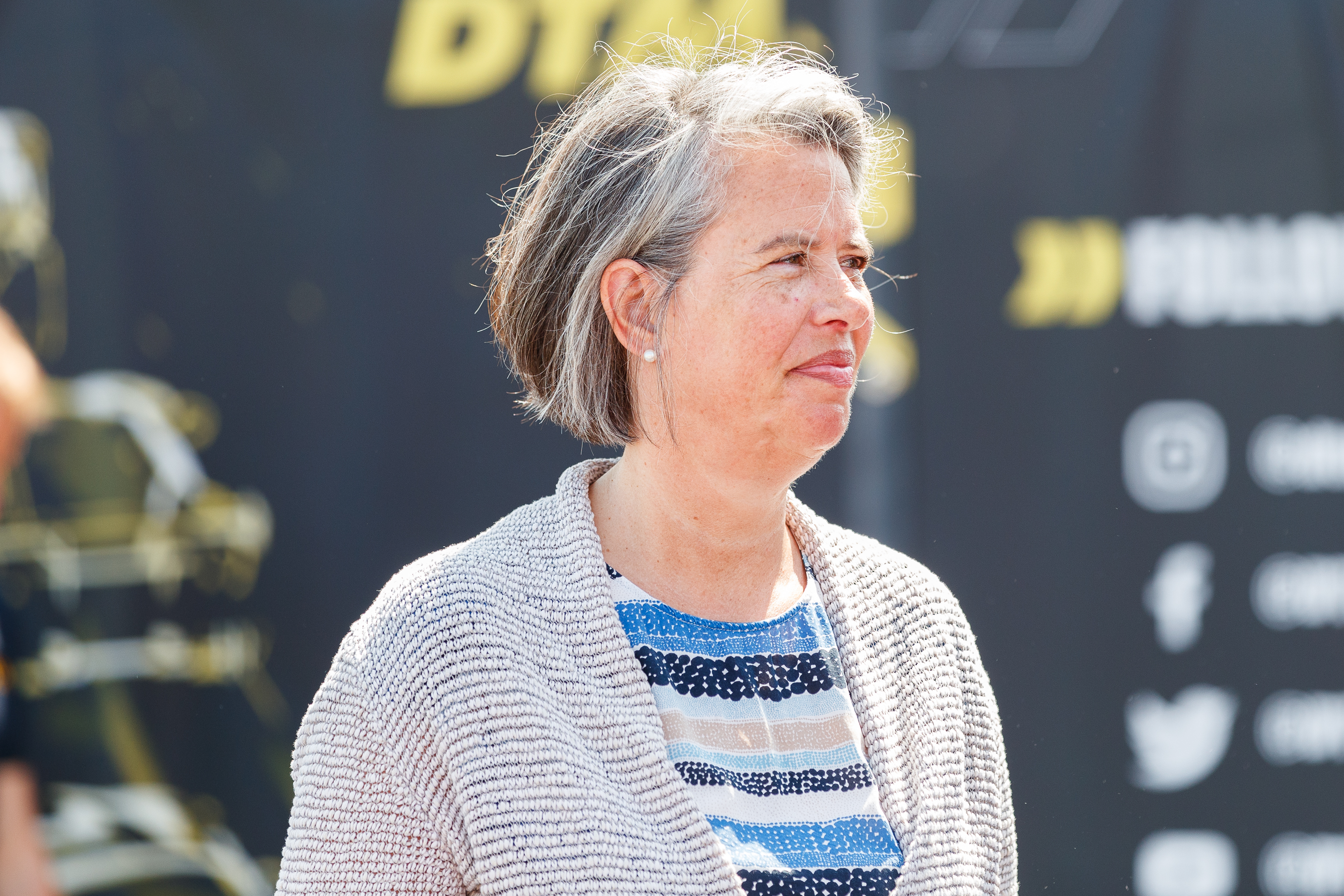
- Zieschang in 2023

Minister of the Interior and Sports of Saxony-Anhalt
- Incumbent
- Assumed office 16 September 2021
- Minister-President: Reiner Haseloff; Sven Schulze
- Preceded by: Michael Richter

Personal details
- Born: 21 August 1970 (age 55) Saarlouis
- Party: Christian Democratic Union (since 1994)

Tamara Zieschang (born 21 August 1970 in Saarlouis) is a German politician serving as minister of the interior and sports of Saxony-Anhalt since 2021. From 2019 to 2021, she served as state secretary of the Federal Ministry of Transport and Digital Infrastructure.
