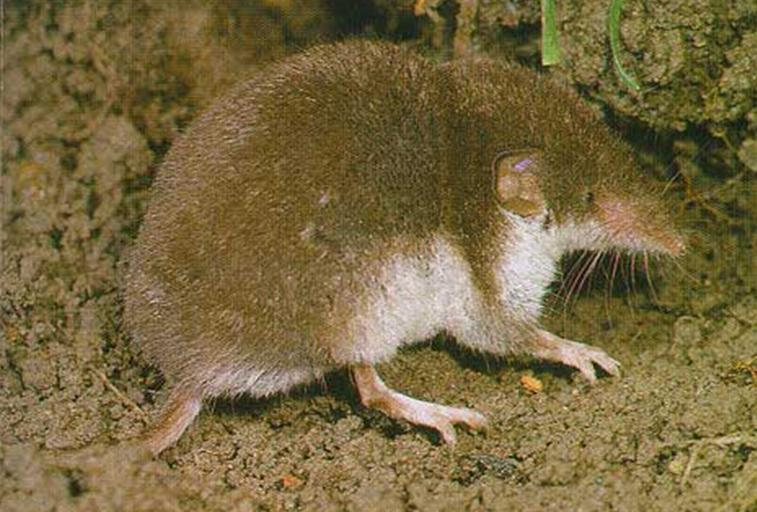

Conservation status
- Least Concern (IUCN 3.1)

Scientific classification
- Kingdom: Animalia
- Phylum: Chordata
- Class: Mammalia
- Order: Eulipotyphla
- Family: Soricidae
- Genus: Crocidura
- Species: C. leucodon

Binomial name
- Crocidura leucodon (Hermann, 1780)
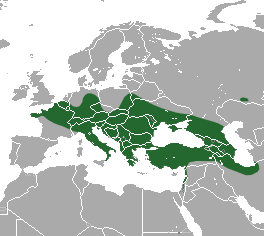
- Bicolored shrew range

Synonyms
- Sorex leucodon Hermann, 1780

= Bicolored shrew =

Species of mammal

The bicolored shrew or bicoloured white-toothed shrew (Crocidura leucodon) is a species of mammal in the family Soricidae. It is found in eastern, central and southern Europe and in western Asia. It is a nocturnal species and feeds on insects and other small creatures. Several litters of young are born during the warmer months of the year in a nest of dry grasses in a concealed location.

== Description ==
The bicoloured white-toothed shrew has a head and body length of 2.5 to 3.5 inches (64 to 89 mm) and a tail length of 2.5 to 3.5 inches (64 to 89 mm). It weighs about 7 to 13 grams (0.25 to 0.46 oz). The upperside is covered in short, dense dark brown fur and the underside is white, with a sharp dividing line between the two colours. The muzzle is long and pink, the teeth are white and the ears project through the hair. The tail is sparsely covered in slightly longer hairs. Young animals are rather paler in colour. These shrews often emit a shrill twittering chatter.

== Distribution and habitat ==
The bicoloured white-toothed shrew is found in eastern, central and southern Europe but not south western France, the Iberian Peninsula or southern Italy. It is also native to the Crimea, the Caucasus, Turkestan and Iran. In the Alps it is found at altitudes of up to 3,300 feet (1,000 m). The habitat of this shrew is pastureland, cultivated fields, gardens, hedgerows, piles of rubble and rubbish heaps. It sometimes seeks shelter in buildings in winter and avoids damp locations.

== Behaviour ==
The bicoloured white-toothed shrew is mainly nocturnal, emerging at dusk but remaining hidden in a cranny or the burrow of some other small animal by day. It is not as active as shrews in the genus Sorex. It is a carnivore, and feeds on insects, spiders, and other small invertebrates and occasionally on small vertebrates.

Breeding takes place between April and September and there may be two to four litters in a year. A nest of dried grasses is constructed in a concealed position, and a litter of three to nine young are born after a thirty one-day gestation period. The young grow rapidly, suckle for about twenty six days, and become sexually mature at forty days.

When danger threatens, one of a family of young shrews will grab its mother's fur near the base of her tail with its jaws, and one by one, the others will hold on to each other's tails in sequence until the whole family is linked together. The mother then rapidly leads them to safety with the young trailing along behind. If the mother is lifted in the air, the young maintain their grip and dangle in a wriggling, furry chain.

== Research ==
The bicolored white-toothed shrew is a natural reservoir species for the Borna disease virus which is the causative agent of Borna disease, a meningoencephalitis of sheep, horses, and other warm-blooded animals including birds, cattle and cats, and may have links to psychiatric disorders in humans and be a hazard to man.
