= Franziska Weidinger =

German politician (born 1976)

Minister of Justice and Consumer Protection of Saxony-Anhalt
- Incumbent
- Assumed office 16 September 2021
- Minister-President: Reiner Haseloff; Sven Schulze
- Preceded by: Anne-Marie Keding

Personal details
- Born: 8 October 1976 (age 49)
- Party: Christian Democratic Union (since 2003)

Franziska Weidinger (born 8 October 1976) is a German politician serving as minister of justice and consumer protection of Saxony-Anhalt since 2021. From 2019 to 2021, she served as chief of staff to Anne-Marie Keding.
