= Borna disease virus =

Mammalian 1 orthobornavirus

Virus classification
- (unranked): Virus
- Realm: Riboviria
- Kingdom: Orthornavirae
- Phylum: Negarnaviricota
- Class: Monjiviricetes
- Order: Mononegavirales
- Family: Bornaviridae
- Genus: Orthobornavirus
- Species: Mammalian 1 orthobornavirus

Species of virus

Borna disease virus 1 G protein

Identifiers
- Symbol: BDV_G
- Pfam: PF06208
- InterPro: IPR009344
Available protein structures:
- PDB: IPR009344 PF06208 (ECOD; PDBsum)
- AlphaFold: IPR009344; PF06208

Borna disease virus 1 P10 protein

Identifiers
- Symbol: BDV_P10
- Pfam: PF06515
- InterPro: IPR009485
Available protein structures:
- PDB: IPR009485 PF06515 (ECOD; PDBsum)
- AlphaFold: IPR009485; PF06515

Borna disease virus 1 P40 protein
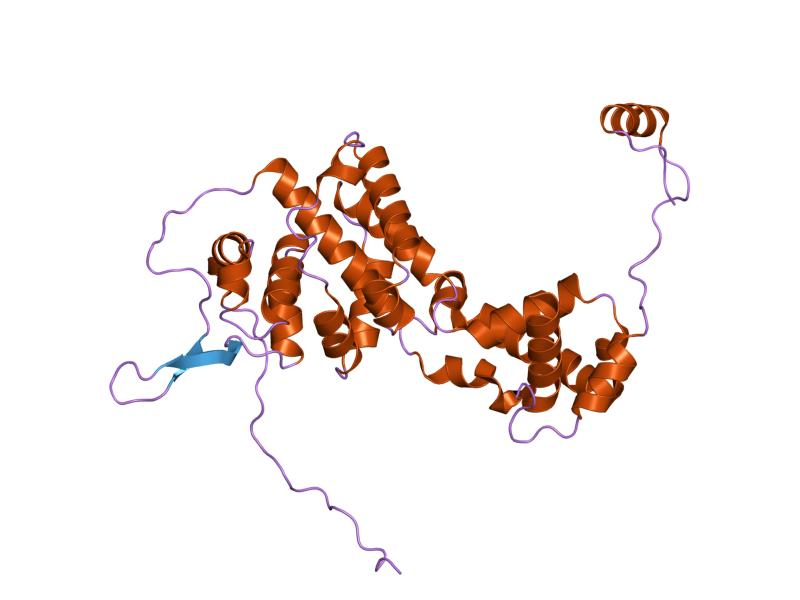
- Crystal structure of the borna disease virus 1 nucleoprotein

Identifiers
- Symbol: BDV_P40
- Pfam: PF06407
- InterPro: IPR009441
- SCOP2: 1n93 / SCOPe / SUPFAM
Available protein structures:
- PDB: IPR009441 PF06407 (ECOD; PDBsum)
- AlphaFold: IPR009441; PF06407

Borna disease virus 1 P24 protein

Identifiers
- Symbol: BDV_P24
- Pfam: PF06595
- InterPro: IPR009517
Available protein structures:
- PDB: IPR009517 PF06595 (ECOD; PDBsum)
- AlphaFold: IPR009517; PF06595

The Borna disease viruses 1 and 2 (BoDV-1 and BoDV-2) are members of the species Mammalian 1 orthobornavirus and cause Borna disease in mammals.

== Virology ==
=== Genome ===
BoDV-1/2 have the smallest genome (8.9 kilobases) of any Mononegavirales member and are unique within that order in their ability to replicate within the host cell nucleus.

BoDV-1 was isolated from a diseased horse in the 1970s, but the virus particles were difficult to characterise. Nonetheless, the virus' genome has been characterised. It is a linear negative-sense single stranded RNA virus in the order Mononegavirales.

Several of the proteins encoded by the BoDV-1 genome have been characterised. The G glycoprotein is important for viral entry into the host cell.

It has been suggested that the p10, or X, protein plays a role in viral RNA synthesis or ribonucleoprotein transport.

The P40 nucleoprotein from BoDV-1 is multi-helical in structure and can be divided into two subdomains, each of which has an alpha-bundle topology. The nucleoprotein assembles into a planar homotetramer, with the RNA genome either wrapping around the outside of the tetramer or possibly fitting within the charged central channel of the tetramer .

P24 (phosphoprotein 24) is an essential component of the RNA polymerase transcription and replication complex. P24 is encoded by open reading frame II (ORF-II) and undergoes high rates of mutation in humans. It [binds amphoterin-HMGB1, a multifunctional protein, directly and may cause deleterious effects in cellular functions by interference with HMGB1. Horse and human P24 have no species-specific amino acid residues, suggesting that the two viruses are related. Numerous interactions of the immune system with the central nervous system have been described. Mood and psychotic disorders, such as severe depression and schizophrenia, are both heterogeneous disorders regarding clinical symptomatology, the acuity of symptoms, the clinical course and the treatment response. BoDV-1 p24 RNA has been detected in the peripheral blood mononuclear cells (PBMCs) of psychiatric patients with such conditions. Some studies find a significant difference in the prevalence of BDV p24 RNA in patients with mood disorders and schizophrenia, whilst others find no difference between patients and control groups. Consequently, debate about the role of BDV in psychiatric diseases remains alive.

=== Replication ===
Bornaviruses enter host cells by endocytosis. The viral genome and associated viral proteins is released into the cytoplasm following fusion of the viral envelope and the endosome membrane. Replication of bornaviruses occurs inside the nucleus. These are the only animal viruses within the order Mononegavirales to do this. Many plant rhabdoviruses replicate in the nucleus.

Bornaviruses have negative sense RNA genomes The negative sense RNA is copied to make a positive sense RNA template. This template is then used to synthesise many copies of the negative sense RNA genome. This is like making copies of a mold, and then using these molds to make many more viruses.

== Endogenous provirus ==
Endogenous viral elements homologous to the nucleoprotein gene of BoDV-1 have been shown to exist in the genomes of several mammalian species, including humans and non-human primates.

== Evolution ==
A Bayesian analysis of Borna disease virus 1 suggests that the current strains diversified ~300 years ago and that avian-host bornaviruses evolved considerably earlier than this. The ancestral virus seems likely to have been a high AT content virus.

== History ==
Borna disease was first described in 1885 as "heated head disease" of cavalry horses in 1885 in the town of Borna, Germany.
