= Bülzig =

- Ortsteil of Zahna-Elster
- Interactive map of Bülzig
- Location within Germany Location within Saxony-Anhalt
- Coordinates: 51°54′N 12°45′E
- Country: Germany
- State: Saxony-Anhalt
- District: Wittenberg
- Town: Zahna-Elster

Area
  - Total: 15.03 km^{2} (5.80 sq mi)
- Elevation: 94 m (308 ft)

Population (2006-12-31)
  - Total: 816
  - Density: 54.3/km^{2} (141/sq mi)
- Time zone: UTC+01:00 (CET)
  - Summer (DST): UTC+02:00 (CEST)
- Postal codes: 06895
- Dialling codes: 034924

Bülzig is a former municipality in Wittenberg district in Saxony-Anhalt, Germany. Since 1 July 2008, it is part of the town Zahna, which was absorbed into the new town Zahna-Elster on 1 January 2011.

== Geography ==
Bülzig lies about 7 km northeast of Lutherstadt Wittenberg. Bülzig is an Ortsteil (division) within the Ortschaft (locality) Zahna of the town Zahna-Elster.

== Economy and transportation ==
Bülzig is connected to Federal Highway (Bundesstraße) B 2, which lies 6 km west of the community, and joins Berlin and Wittenberg.

== Notable people ==
- Reiner Haseloff (born 1954), politician
