= Borna (given name) =

Borna (Croatian pronunciation: [bôːrna]) is a masculine Croatian given name. It is also a masculine Persian given name, (Persian: برنا). Borna in Persian language means young. Notable people with the name include:

- Borna (duke) (died 821), Duke of Dalmatia
- Borna Barišić (born 1992), Croatian football player
- Borna Ćorić (born 1996), Croatian tennis player
- Borna Franić (born 1975), Croatian handball player
- Borna Gojo (born 1998), Croatian tennis player
- Borna Rendulić (born 1992), Croatian ice hockey player
- Borna Sosa (born 1998), Croatian football player
- Borna Hosseini (born 2004), filmmaker
