= 1948 West Berlin state election =

The election to the city council of Greater Berlin from December 5, 1948, took place in exceptional circumstances. The last election had occurred just two years earlier; however, since then the city had been separated into East and West. These elections were held only in the Western sectors accordingly. Moreover, West Berlin was experiencing a blockade since June 1948 from the outside world and was only surviving due to the airlift. Against this background, the elections to the city council took place.

== Aftermath ==
The Social Democratic Party (SPD) experienced its largest ever election victory. They increased their share of the vote by 15.8 percentage points to receive 64.5% of the votes, the highest percentage that has ever been achieved by a party in a democratic election in Germany. The Christian Democratic Union (CDU) slumped by 2.8 percentage points to 19.4% of the vote, while the Free Democratic Party (FDP) improved its showing to 16.1% of the vote. The Socialist Unity Party did not compete in these elections to the West Berlin City Council which they regarded as illegitimate.

Although the SPD had a clear absolute majority, due to the complex political situation it formed a unity coalition with the CDU and the FDP. Consequently, Social Democrat Ernst Reuter was elected mayor of West Berlin.

== Results ==
Summary of the results of the 5 December 1948 election to Berlin's Abgeordnetenhaus
Parties	Votes	%	+/-	Seats	+/-
Social Democratic Party of Germany	858,461	64.5%	+15.8%	76	+13
Christian Democratic Union of Germany	258,664	19.4%	-2.8%	26	-3
Free Democratic Party	214,145	16.1%	+6.8%	17	+5
Total	1,331,270	100%		119	-11
Source: de:Wahl zur Stadtverordnetenversammlung von Groß-Berlin 1948
