= Andreas Weidinger (politician) =

Danish politician

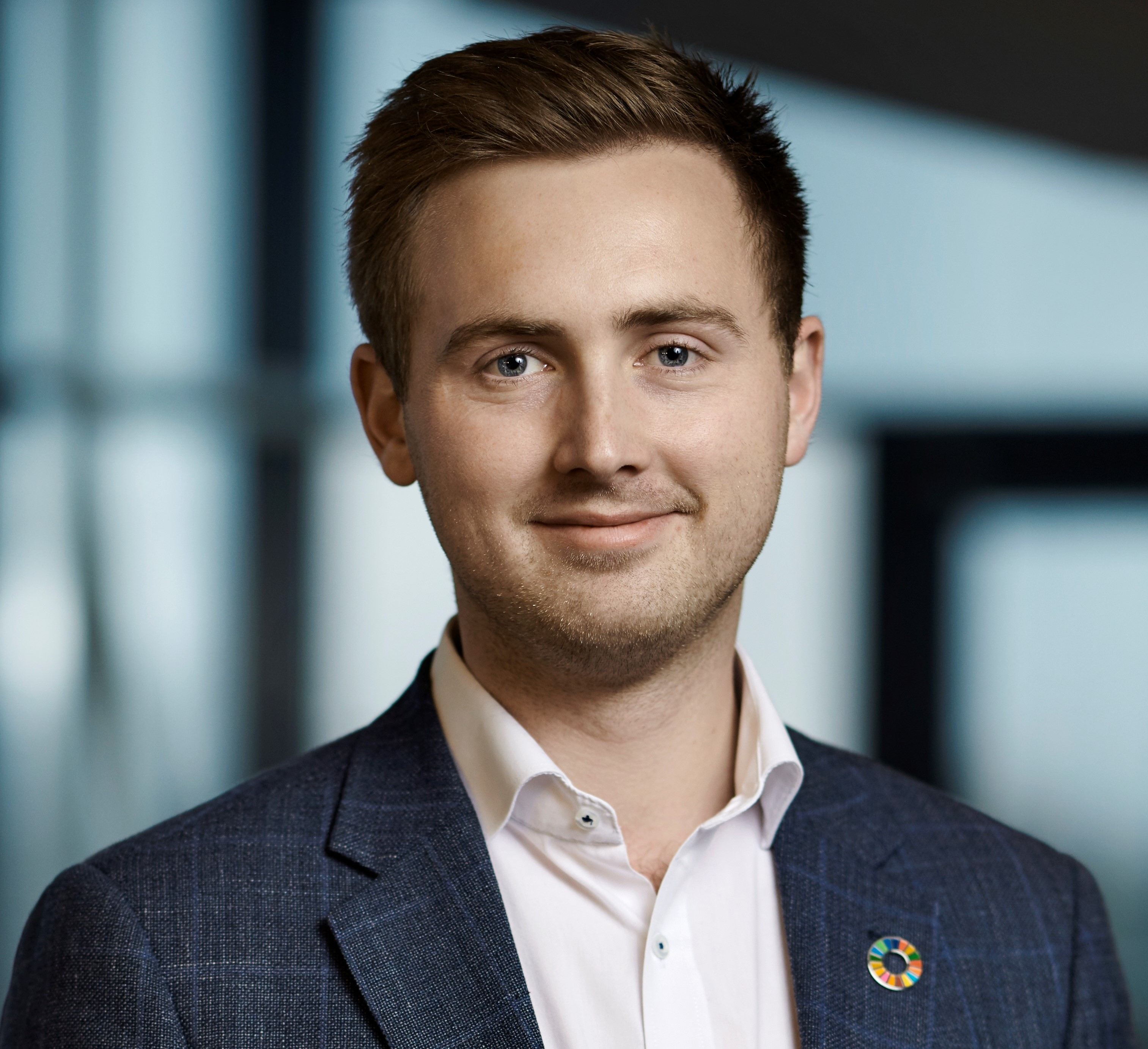
- Andreas Weidinger in 2018

55th chairman of Young Conservatives
- In office March 2016 – March 2018
- Preceded by: Mikkel Ballegaard
- Succeeded by: Anders Storgaard

Member of Gentofte Municipal Council
- Incumbent
- Assumed office 1 January 2018

Personal details
- Born: 10 February 1992 (age 34) Rigshospitalet, Denmark
- Education: Øregård Gymnasium
- Occupation: Politician, entrepreneur
- Website: https://andreasweidinger.dk/

Andreas Sebastian Weidinger (born 10 February 1992) is a Danish politician and entrepreneur. Weidinger is a member of the Municipal Council in Gentofte Municipality, elected for the Conservative People's Party. From 2016 to 2018, Andreas Weidinger was national chairman of Conservative Youth.

== Background and private life ==
Andreas Weidinger was born at Rigshospitalet in Copenhagen on 10 February 1992, the son of Wolfgang Weidinger and Maj Britt Weidinger. Weidinger grew up in Frederiksberg and went to Frederik Barfods Skole. Currently, Weidinger lives in Charlottenlund in Gentofte Municipality.

== Political career ==
=== Youth politics ===
Andreas Weidinger has been active in the Young Conservatives (KU) for a number of years and was elected to the organisation's executive committee in 2014.

On 21 March 2016, news outlets reported the rise of division within the organisation caused by the expulsion of certain members leading up to its national council held during the weekend. Weidinger, who at the event had been elected national chairman of the KU after Mikkel Ballegaard, had prior to the council himself been expelled from his local KU association of KU Copenhagen for backing the expulsions, which he stated were due to the members having "campaigned for other parties" as well as harsh rhetoric. However, was eligible to become chairman as he was incorporated into another local KU association. Among the expelled members were chairman of KU Vejle and future member of the Danish Parliament Mikkel Bjørn.

In March 2018, he was succeeded by Andreas Storgaard Weidinger and won the 2017 national championship in debating at the Folkemøde on Bornholm. In this connection, he was interviewed by the Danish newspaper Politiken where he described his ideological position as socially conservative.

=== Municipal politics ===
Weidinger first ran for public office at 2013 municipal elections in 2013, where he ran for Copenhagen City Council. Although he with 358 personal votes was not elected, his campaign was praised in the newspaper Metroxpress, who awarded him the best candidate on social media.

After his studies were completed, Weidinger moved to Gentofte and in 2017 stood in the municipal elections in Gentofte Municipality. Here he was elected to the municipal council with 598 personal votes, third most on the conservative list. Here he became deputy chairman of the Elderly, Social and Health Committee and a member of the Children's Committee, the School Committee and the Business, Employment and Integration Committee.
