= Lydia Hüskens =

German politician (born 1964)

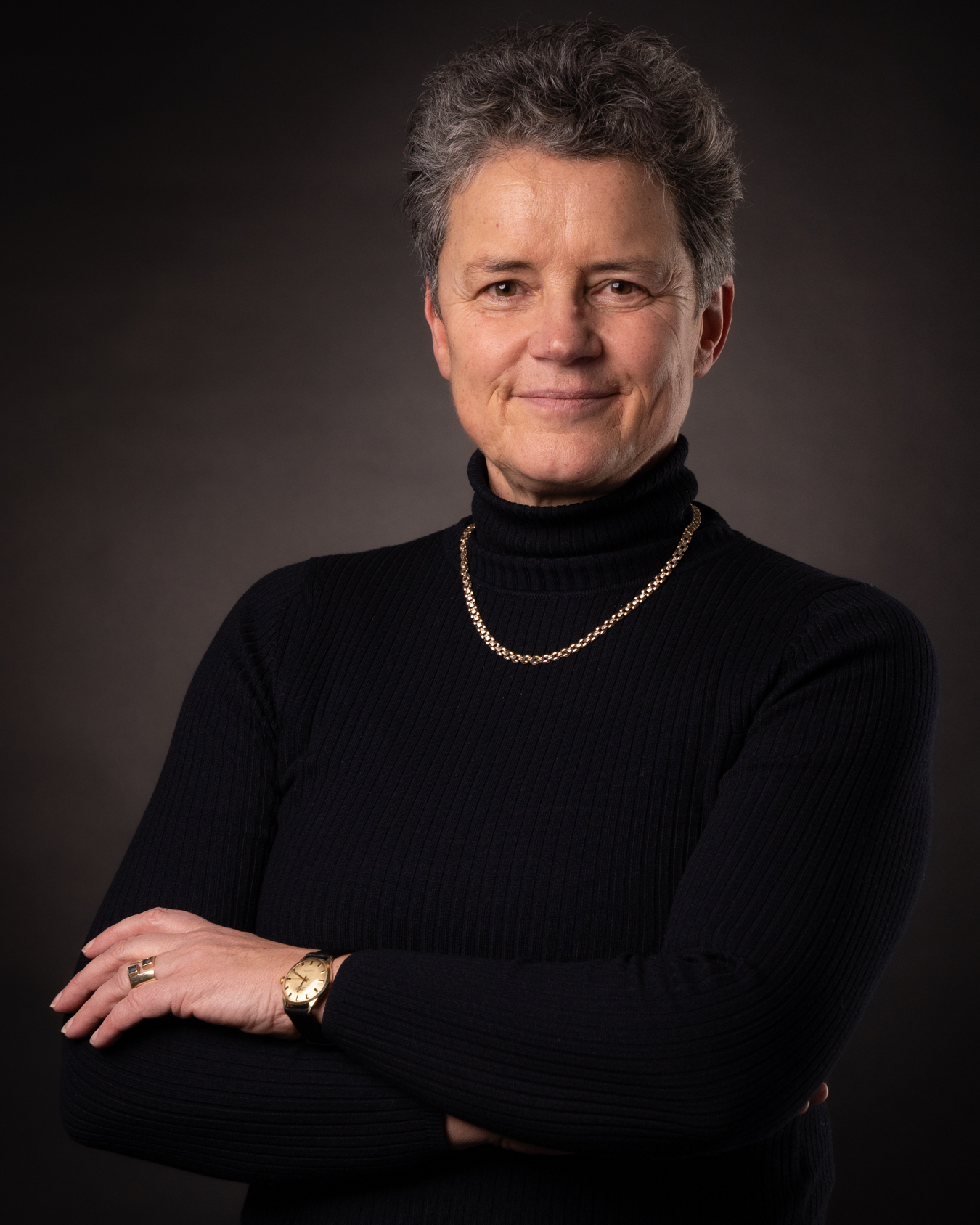
- Hüskens in 2022

Minister for Infrastructure and Digital Affairs of Saxony-Anhalt
- Incumbent
- Assumed office 16 September 2021
- Minister-President: Reiner Haseloff

Personal details
- Born: 26 March 1964 (age 62) Geldern
- Party: Free Democratic Party (since 1989)

Lydia Hüskens (born 26 March 1964 in Geldern) is a German politician. She has served as deputy minister-president of Saxony-Anhalt and as state minister of infrastructure and digital affairs since 2021. She has been a member of the Landtag of Saxony-Anhalt since 2021, having previously served from 2002 to 2011. She has served as chairwoman of the Free Democratic Party in Saxony-Anhalt since 2021.
