= Proventricular dilatation disease =

Disease of psittacine birds

Proventricular dilatation disease (PDD) is an incurable probably viral disease of psittacine birds. It was first recognized and described in 1978 by Dr. Hannis L. Stoddard. Since the first reported cases were involving species of macaw, the condition was termed macaw wasting syndrome.

== Clinical signs ==
The clinical presentation of this disease varies with the individual as well as in severity of those symptoms. Often the symptoms include a gastrointestinal component, but many times birds with this disease will present with neurologic signs as well, or in lieu of digestive anomalies.

Gastrointestinal signs may include: Regurgitation, crop impaction, poor appetite, weight loss, or passage of undigested food in the feces. Neurologic symptoms may include: Weakness, ataxia, paresis, proprioceptive deficits, head tremors, and rarely seizures. Muscle wasting and a generalized poor body condition is usually found as well. The virus can also affect the Purkinje cells of the heart, the adrenal medulla, the brain, and the spinal cord.

On necropsy the affected organs appear dilated and may include the crop, proventriculus, ventriculus, and small intestine. On histopathological examination the tissues will contain a lymphoplasmacytic infiltration in the peripheral and central nervous tissue. The causative virus is believed to commonly affect the myenteric plexuses which will also lead to the presentation of atrophied smooth muscle within the affected gastrointestinal organs. It is this atrophy and loss of tone in the organs that causes the dilation and subsequent gastrointestinal symptoms which are commonly the first sign of disease for the owners.

== Cause ==
In July 2008, a team of researchers at the University of California, San Francisco was able to identify a virus that may cause PDD, which they have named avian bornavirus (ABV). A member of the Bornaviridae family, avian bornavirus was isolated in 71 percent of samples from infected birds, but in none of the healthy birds. The researchers were able to clone a full-length genome of the virus from avian tissue. Later analyses revealed that numerous distinct avian bornaviruses exist - not all of them cause PDD. Gancz et al. succeeded in inducing PDD in cockatiels by inoculation of brain tissue from avian bornavirus-positive birds while Gray et al. caused PDD in Patagonian conures by inoculation of a tissue-culture derived isolate of avian bornavirus.

== Taxonomy ==
Family Bornaviridae: avian bornaviruses
Genus	Species	Virus (Abbreviation)
Orthobornavirus	Passeriform 1 orthobornavirus	canary bornavirus 1 (CnBV-1)
Orthobornavirus	Passeriform 1 orthobornavirus	canary bornavirus 2 (CnBV-2)
Orthobornavirus	Passeriform 1 orthobornavirus	canary bornavirus 3 (CnBV-3))
Orthobornavirus	Passeriform 2 orthobornavirus	estrildid finch bornavirus 1 (EsBV-1)
Orthobornavirus	Psittaciform 1 orthobornavirus	parrot bornavirus 1 (PaBV-1)
Orthobornavirus	Psittaciform 1 orthobornavirus	parrot bornavirus 2 (PaBV-2)
Orthobornavirus	Psittaciform 1 orthobornavirus	parrot bornavirus 3 (PaBV-3)
Orthobornavirus	Psittaciform 1 orthobornavirus	parrot bornavirus 4 (PaBV-4)
Orthobornavirus	Psittaciform 1 orthobornavirus	parrot bornavirus 7 (PaBV-7)
Orthobornavirus	Psittaciform 2 orthobornavirus	parrot bornavirus 5 (PaBV-5)
Orthobornavirus	Waterbird 1 orthobornavirus	aquatic bird bornavirus 1 (ABBV-1)
Orthobornavirus	Waterbird 1 orthobornavirus	aquatic bird bornavirus 2 (ABBV-2)

== Diagnosis ==
Traditional diagnosis included radiographs. The vet may ask for a follow-up radiograph with a barium marker to collect more data on digestion to aid in confirmation of PDD. A tissue sample is a more reliable method as well but invasive yet the only definitive diagnosis with live parrots.

The presence of avian bornaviruses may be detected in two ways: Testing fecal samples, cloacal swabs and blood for the presence of the virus or examining the bird's blood for ABV-specific antibodies by western blot or ELISA. All tests give a percentage of false positives and false negatives so detection of ABV or antibody against it does not mean that PDD will follow. The disease does not follow a clear path of development or transmission.
