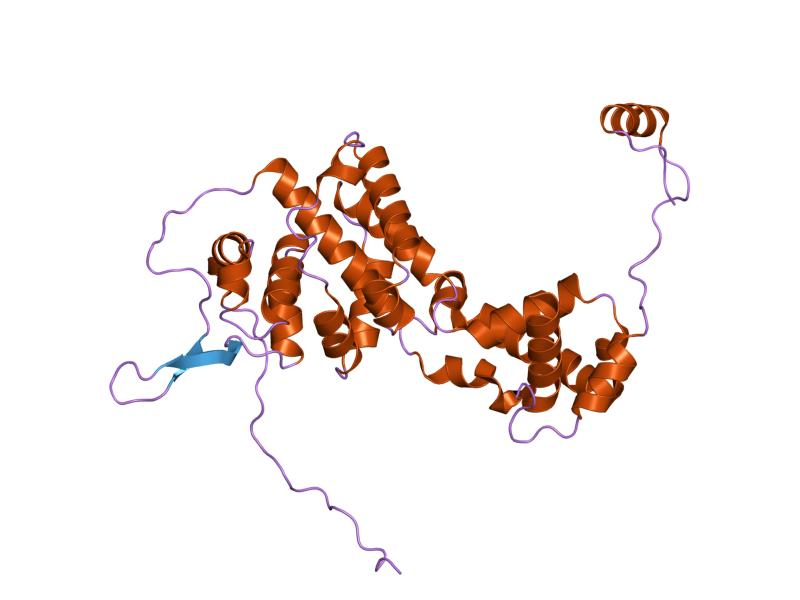

Virus classification
- (unranked): Virus
- Realm: Riboviria
- Kingdom: Orthornavirae
- Phylum: Negarnaviricota
- Class: Monjiviricetes
- Order: Mononegavirales
- Family: Bornaviridae

Genera
- See text

= Bornaviridae =

Family of viruses

Bornaviridae is a family of negative-strand RNA viruses in the order Mononegavirales. Horses, sheep, cattle, rodents, birds, reptiles, and humans serve as natural hosts. Diseases associated with bornaviruses include Borna disease, a fatal neurologic disease of mammals restricted to central Europe; and proventricular dilatation disease (PDD) in birds. Bornaviruses may cause encephalitis in mammals like horses or sheep. The family contains four genera.

== History ==
Borna disease was first identified in 1926 and its genome was isolated in 1990. The ICTV proposed the creation in 1996 of the family Bornaviridae along with the genus Bornavirus (today Orthobornavirus). The viral family is named after the city of Borna in Saxony, Germany, which is where many animals were lost to the sporadic encephalopathy caused by the viral disease.

== Structure ==
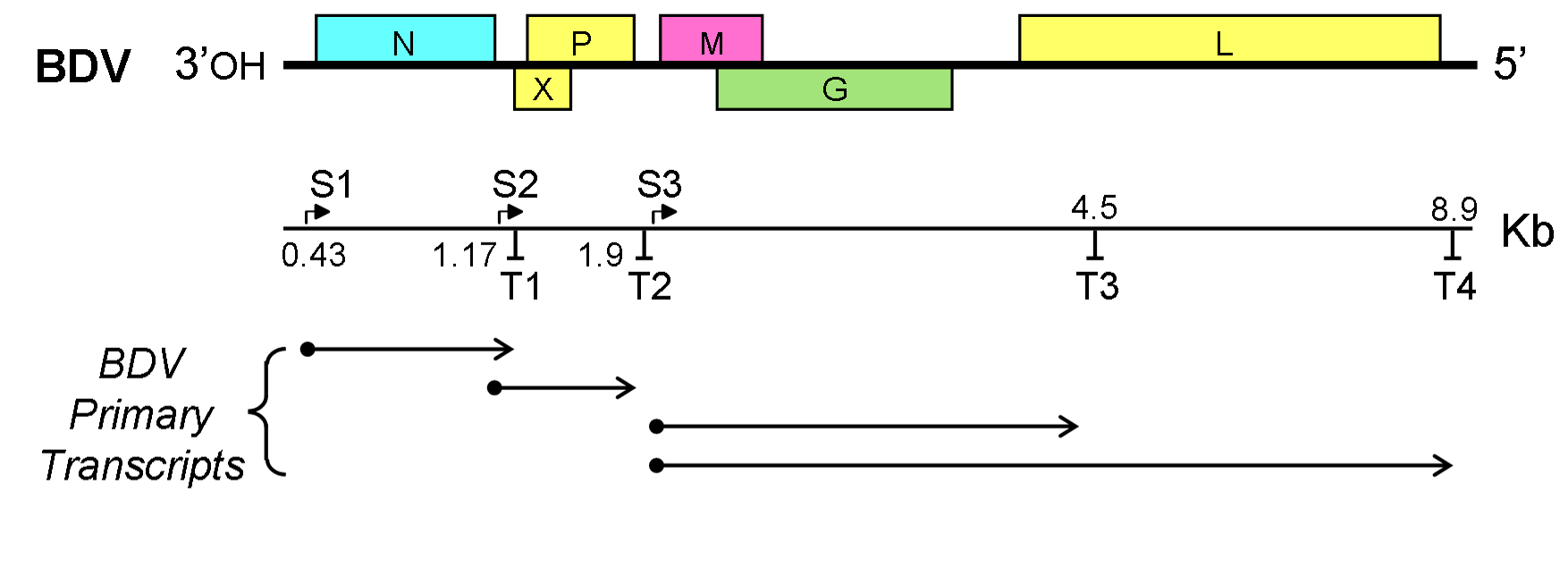
Organization and transcription map of Borna disease virus (BDV) genome

Orthobornavirions are enveloped, with spherical geometries and helical capsids. The diameter is around 70 to 130 nm. Genomes are made of negative-sense single-stranded RNA. They are linear, monopartite and around 8.9 kbp in length. The genome codes for nine proteins.

Proteins of orthobornaviruses that have been characterized:

Protein	Function
N	Helical nucleocapside protein
G	Envelope glycoprotein
L	Viral polymerase
P	Phosphoprotein involved in replication
M	Matrix protein
X	Has not been fully characterized—perhaps nuclear transport

== Life cycle ==
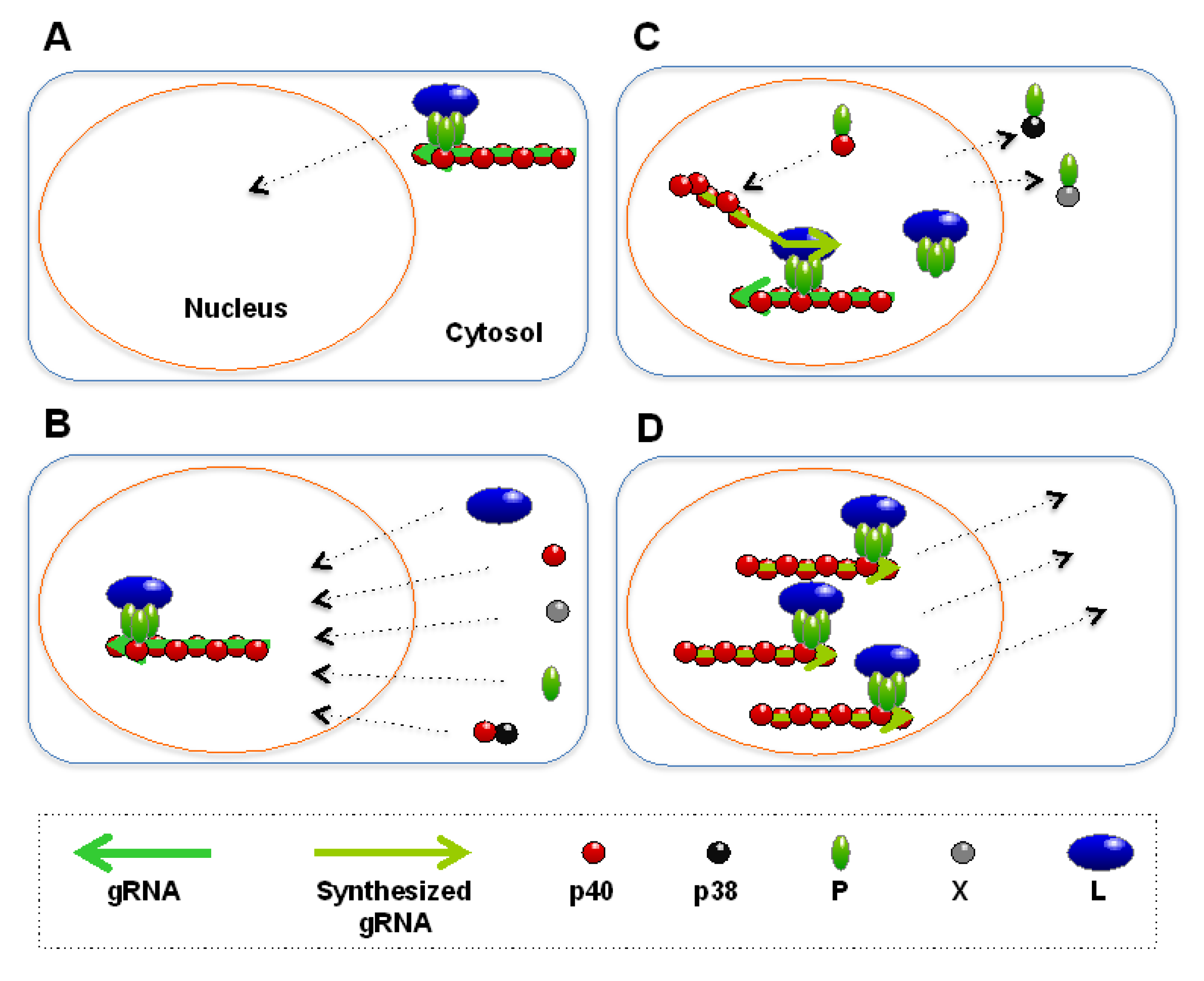
Nuclear import and export events in the replication cycle of a bornavirus

In the Mononegavirales order, Bornaviridae is one of only two families with viruses that replicate in the nucleus. Entry into the host cell is achieved by attachment of the viral GP glycoproteins to host receptors, which mediates clathrin-mediated endocytosis. Replication follows the negative stranded RNA virus replication model. Negative stranded RNA virus transcription, using polymerase stuttering, with some alternative splicing mechanism, is the method of transcription. The virus exits the host cell by nuclear pore export. This virus usually has a highly variable incubation period of around a few weeks to several months. Horses, sheep, cattle, rodents, birds, and humans serve as the natural hosts. Transmission routes are fomites, contact, urine, feces, and saliva.

Genus	Host details	Tissue tropism	Entry details	Release details	Replication site	Assembly site	Transmission
Orthobornavirus	Horses; sheep; cattle; rodents; birds; humans	Neurons; astrocytes; oligodendrocytes; ependymal cells	Clathrin-mediated endocytosis	Budding	Nucleus	Cytoplasm	Fomites; contact: saliva; contact: urine; contact: feces

== Pathogenicity ==
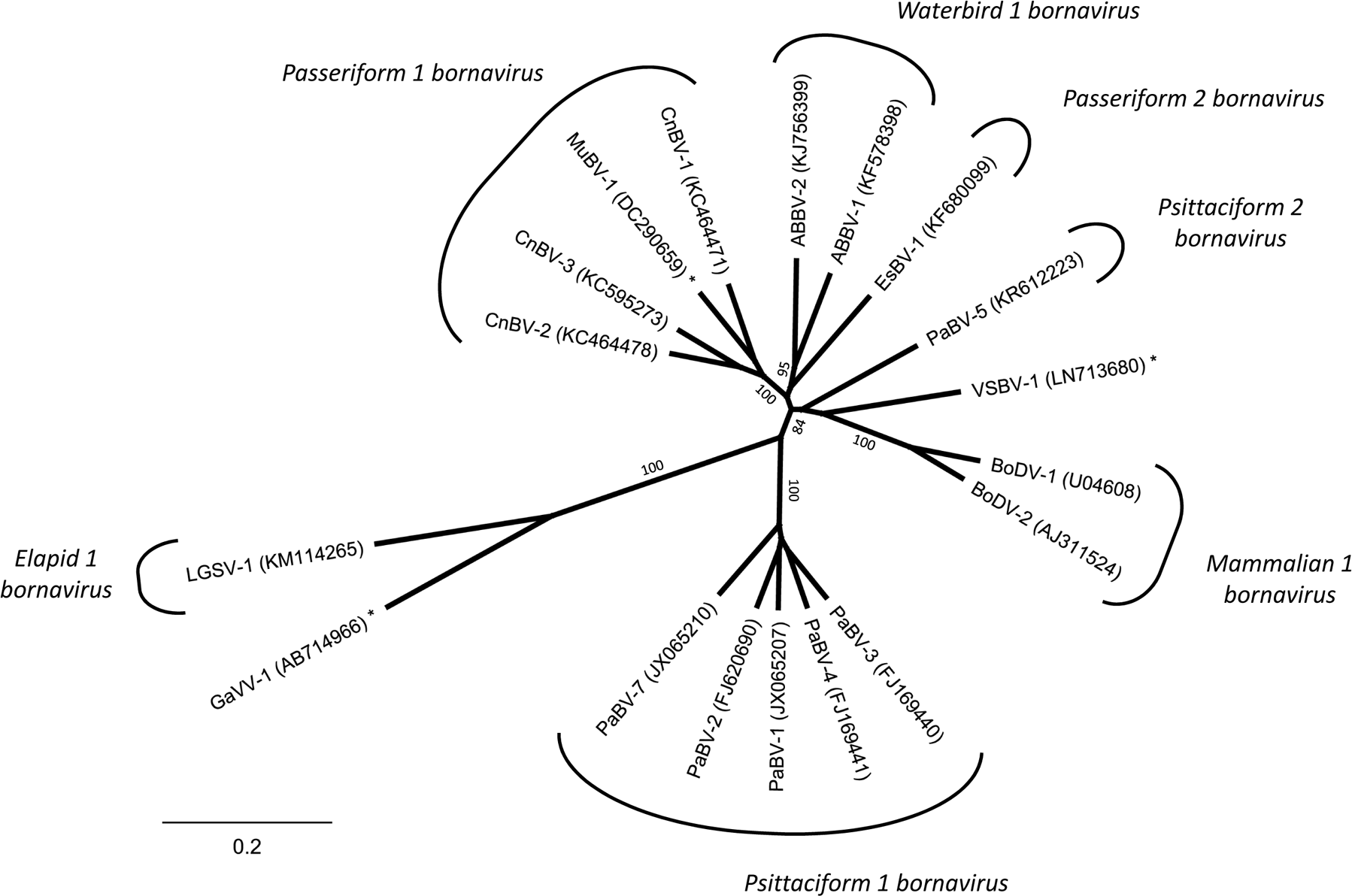
Phylogenetic tree of Bornaviridae

Between 2011 and 2013, three German breeders of variegated squirrels (Sciurus variegatoides) had encephalitis with similar clinical signs and died 2 to 4 months after onset of the clinical symptoms. Genomic analysis found a previously unknown orthobornavirus in a contact squirrel and in brain tissue from the three men, the researchers reported, and it is the "likely causative agent" in their deaths. Prior to this, bornaviruses were not thought to be responsible for human diseases. More VSBV-1 infected squirrels from the subfamilies Sciurinae and Callosciurinae were also confirmed to be present not only in Germany but in the Netherlands. Zero VSBV-1 positive squirrels showed clinical signs of infection. Since behavioral disease has been studied in BoDV-1 infected animals like rhesus monkeys, tree shrews, and rats, BoDV-1 has also been hypothesized to be associated with humans psychiatric conditions such as schizophrenia and affective psychoses. In several studies with large sample sizes, there has been an association with increased presence of BoDV-1 antibodies in hospitalized psychiatric patients and a higher seroprevalence rate among the psychiatric patients when compared to the control groups.

== Taxonomy ==
The family contains the following genera:

- Carbovirus
- Cartilovirus
- Cultervirus
- Orthobornavirus
