= Borna disease =

Borna disease viruses 1 and 2
- Specialty: Veterinary medicine

Borna disease virus

Virus classification
- (unranked): Virus
- Realm: Riboviria
- Kingdom: Orthornavirae
- Phylum: Negarnaviricota
- Class: Monjiviricetes
- Order: Mononegavirales
- Family: Bornaviridae
- Genus: Orthobornavirus
- Species: Orthobornavirus bornaense

Subtypes
- Borna disease virus 1; Borna disease virus 2

Borna disease, also known as sad horse disease, is an infectious neurological syndrome of warm-blooded animals, caused by Borna disease viruses 1 and 2 (BoDV-1/2). BoDV-1/2 are neurotropic viruses of the species Orthobornavirus bornaense, and members of the Bornaviridae family within the Mononegavirales order.

Borna disease is a severe neurological illness that predominantly affects horses and sheep, but it has been observed in a wide range of mammals. The disease is characterised by ataxia and abnormal depressive behaviour, frequently culminating in death. There have been rare cases of human fatalities associated with encephalitis caused by Borna disease virus infection. Additionally, correlative evidence exists linking BoDV-1/2 infection with neuropsychiatric disorders such as bipolar disorder in humans.

== History ==
Borna disease was first described in 1885, when all horses belonging to a cavalry regiment stationed near the city of Borna in Saxony, Germany, died from a hitherto unknown disease, then termed hitzige Kopfkrankheit ("hot-tempered head illness"). In 1909, Ernst Joest and Kurt Degen discovered distinctive inclusions in the nerves of horses that had died of Borna disease, which were named Joest-Degen inclusion bodies. This histopathological feature remains in use today to confirm the presence of Borna disease. In 1924, the Austrian virologist Wilhelm Zwick suggested a virus as the cause of the disease.

== Transmission ==
The mode of transmission of BoDV-1/2 is unclear but probably occurs through intranasal exposure to contaminated saliva or nasal secretions. Following infection, individuals may develop Borna disease, or may remain subclinical, possibly acting as a carrier of the virus. The only known animal reservoir of BoDV-1 is the bicolored shrew (Crocidura leucodon), which is not susceptible to Borna disease. It is unclear whether human or livestock infections are due to zoonotic transmission from the bicolored shrew.

== Disease in animals ==
=== Mammals ===
Borna disease viruses 1 and 2 appear to have wide host ranges, having been detected in horses, cattle, sheep, new world camelids, dogs, cats, and foxes. In 1995, BoDV-1 was isolated from cats with a "staggering disease" in Sweden. BoDV-1 has been detected in animals in Europe, Asia, Africa and North America.

Symptoms of Borna disease in horses and sheep start after a four-week incubation period followed by the development of immune-mediated meningitis and encephalomyelitis. Clinical manifestations vary but may include excited or depressed behaviour, ataxia, teeth grinding, excessive salivating, ocular disorders and abnormal posture and movement. Later stages are characterised by bouts of fever and flailing of limbs while lying down. Death occurs a few days to weeks after symptom onset. Mortality rates are 80-100% in horses and greater than 50% in sheep.

Experimental infection of rats has been demonstrated to lead to learning impairments and altered social behaviour. The virus appears to be distributed primarily in the limbic system of the brain, including the hippocampus and entorhinal cortex. These areas of the brain are considered to be of importance in emotion.

=== Birds ===
Avian bornaviruses, a group of related viruses, have been reported, yet not proven, as the cause of proventricular dilatation disease (PDD), a disease of pet parrots. The use of a 'positive' brain cell culture containing ABV to inoculate another psittacine (parrot) bird resulted in the inoculated bird's death and subsequent histopathological diagnosis of PDD (mononuclear infiltrative ganglioneuritis). Earlier research with purified avian bornavirus inoculant (while did result in the death of parrots) did not reproduce histopathological changes associated with PDD.

== Disease in humans ==
Antibodies to BoDV-1 in humans were first discovered in the mid-1980s, suggesting that humans can be non-fatally infected. Antibodies to BoDV-1 and BoDV-1 antigen have also been detected in blood donors.

=== Encephalitis ===
In 2018, three fatal cases of Borna disease in humans were confirmed in Germany. Three people were suspected to have been infected via organ transplants from the same donor, two of whom died. A third fatal case was unconnected to the organ donation. All three deaths were due to severe encephalitis.

In 2020, and again in 2025, several additional cases of human infection were identified in the German federal state of Bavaria. In total, there have been 24 cases of confirmed BoDV-1 infection of humans between 1996 and 2021. The infection was almost always fatal. All cases occurred in known areas of spread of BoDV-1, including the federal states of Bavaria, Brandenburg, Thuringia, and Saxony-Anhalt.

=== Psychiatric disease ===
There is some evidence that there may be a relationship between BoDV-1 infection and psychiatric disease.

In 1990, Janice E. Clements and colleagues reported in the journal Science that antibodies to a protein encoded by the BoDV-1 genome are found in the blood of patients with behavioral disorders. In the early 1990s, researchers in Germany, America, and Japan conducted an investigation of 5000 patients with psychiatric disorders, and found they were 5x more likely to test positive for BoDV-1 antibodies. Subsequent studies have also presented evidence for an association between BoDV-1 and human psychiatric disorders. However, not all researchers consider the link between BoDV-1 and human psychiatric disease to be conclusively proven. A study published in 2003 found no BoDV-1 antibodies in 62 patients with the deficit form of schizophrenia.

Additional evidence for a role of BoDV-1 in psychiatric disorders comes from reports that the drug amantadine, which is used to treat influenza infections, has had some success in treating depression and clearing BoDV-1 infection.
