= Sven Schulze =

German politician (born 1979)

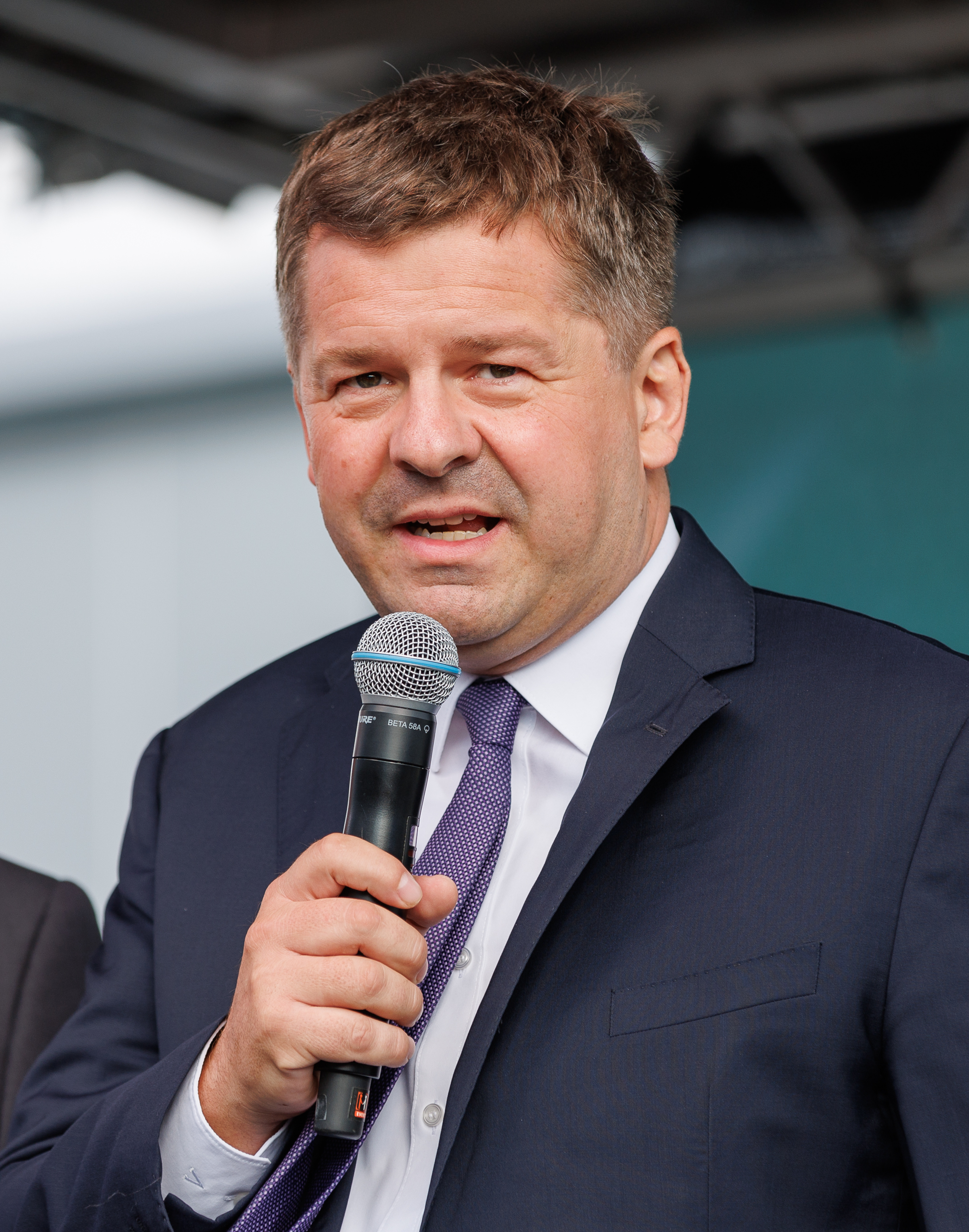
- Schulze in 2024

Minister-President of Saxony-Anhalt
- Incumbent
- Assumed office 28 January 2026
- Preceded by: Reiner Haseloff

Minister for Economic Affairs, Tourism, Agriculture and Forests of Saxony-Anhalt
- In office 16 September 2021 – 28 January 2026
- President: Reiner Haseloff
- Preceded by: Jörg Felgner (Economic Affairs); Claudia Dalbert (Agriculture)
- Succeeded by: Michael Richter

Member of the European Parliament
- In office 1 July 2014 – 15 September 2021
- Constituency: Germany

Personal details
- Born: 31 July 1979 (age 47) Quedlinburg, East Germany
- Party: CDU (since 1997)
- Children: 3
- Education: Clausthal University of Technology
- Occupation: Engineer • Politician

Sven Schulze (born 31 July 1979) is a German politician of the Christian Democratic Union (CDU) who has served as Minister-President of Saxony-Anhalt since January 2026. He previously served since 2021 as Minister for Economic Affairs, Tourism, Agriculture and Forests of Saxony-Anhalt in the third government of former Minister-President Reiner Haseloff from 2021 to 2026.

Schulze was a Member of the European Parliament from 2014 to 2021. Since March 2021, he has been the state leader of the CDU Sachsen-Anhalt.

Haseloff, who was Minister-President from 2011 until his retirement in January 2026, had confirmed on 7 August 2025 that he will not run again as the CDU's top candidate in the 6 September 2026 Saxony-Anhalt state election. Schulze took over as Minister-President of Saxony-Anhalt and leads the CDU campaign.

Schulze was not a member of the Landtag, but for 2026 stood in Magdeburg in the constituency Magdeburg III that had been held by CDU since 2002. In 2026, CDU lost all of its 40 constituencies, Schulze with 31.7% to 35.2% for Christian Mertens (AfD). He will get a seat assigned via his party list.

== Education and early career ==
Schulze studied industrial engineering at Technical University Clausthal, and then worked as a sales manager in a medium-sized engineering company in Harz.

== Political career ==
=== Early beginnings ===
In 1997, Schulze joined the CDU and the Junge Union (youth of CDU). He was a member of the city council of Heteborn and in the county council of Quedlinburg.

Since 2006, Schulze has been a board member of the CDU Sachsen-Anhalt and the chairman of the Junge Union of Saxony-Anhalt. In 2011, he became chairman of the working committee for European affairs of the CDU Sachsen-Anhalt.

=== Member of the European Parliament, 2014–2021 ===
In May 2014, Schulze was elected to the European Parliament. There, he served as vice-chair of the Committee on Transport and Tourism from 2019. He was previously a member of the Committee on Industry, Research and Energy (2017-2019) and of the Committee on Employment and Social Affairs.

In addition to his committee assignments, Schulze was part of the parliament's delegations for relations with the Mashreq Countries, the Parliamentary Assembly - Union for the Mediterranean and with the countries of Southeast Asia and the Association of Southeast Asian Nations (since 2021). He also served as a member of the European Parliament Intergroup on Artificial Intelligence and Digital. and the European Parliament Intergroup on Biodiversity, Countryside, Hunting and Recreational Fisheries.

=== Career in state politics ===
Since 2021, Schulze has been serving as chairman of the CDU Saxony-Anhalt.

As one of the state's representatives at the Bundesrat since 2021, Schulze served on the Committee on Agriculture and Consumer Protection and the Committee on Economic Affairs. He was a member of the 'German-Russian Friendship Group' set up by the Bundesrat and the Russian Federation Council (dissolved 8 April 2022, six weeks after Russia had begun its illegal war of aggression against Ukraine).

On 13 February 2022, Schulze was a delegate to the Federal Convention for the purpose of electing the President of Germany.

== Political positions ==
Ahead of the Christian Democrats’ leadership election in 2022, Schulze publicly endorsed Friedrich Merz to succeed Armin Laschet as the party’s chair.
