= Reiner Haseloff =

German politician (born 1954)

Reiner Haseloff MdL MdBR
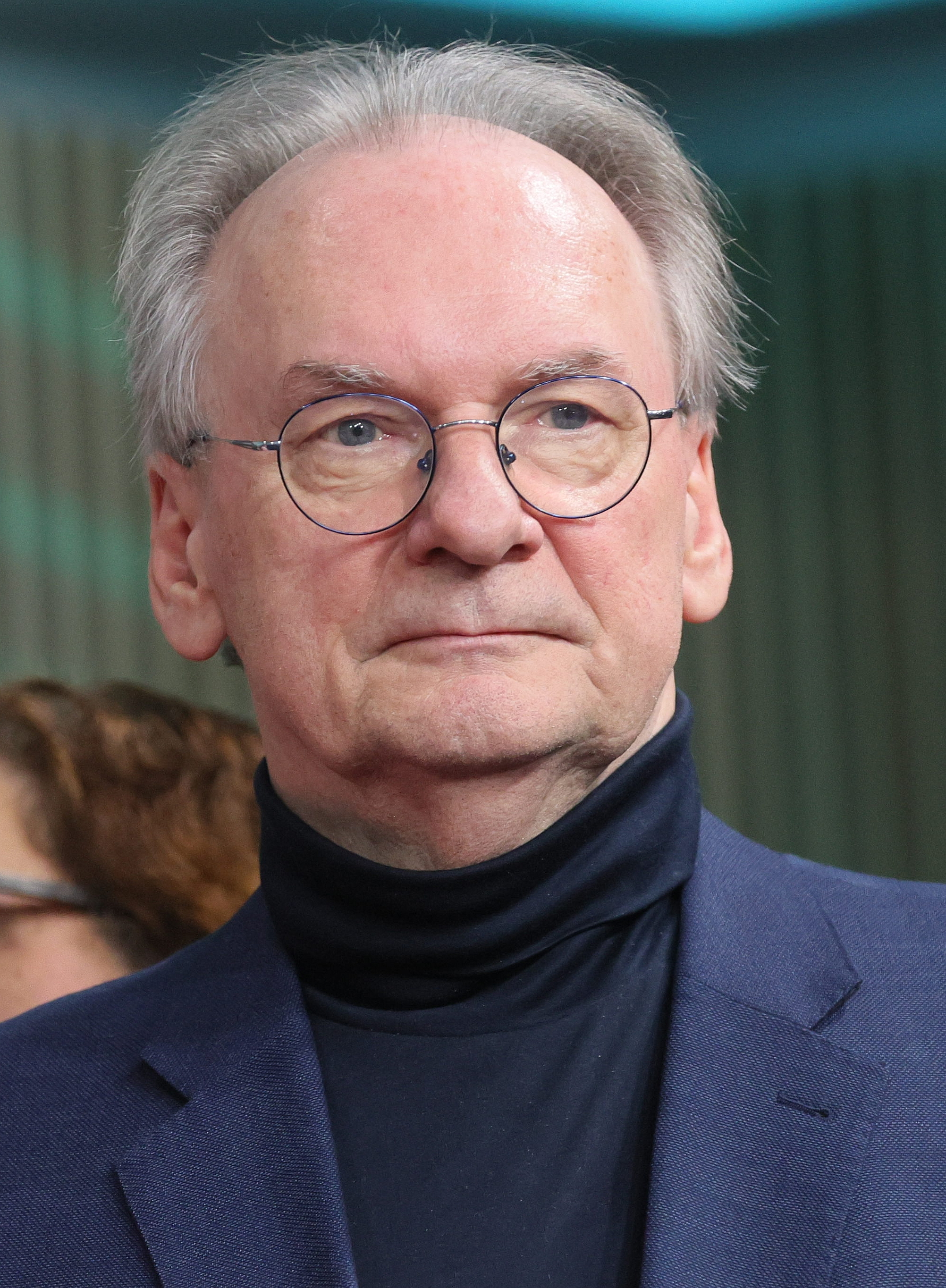
- Haseloff in 2025

Minister-President of Saxony-Anhalt
- In office 19 April 2011 – 28 January 2026
- Deputy: Jens Bullerjahn; Petra Grimm-Benne; Armin Willingmann; Lydia Hüskens
- Preceded by: Wolfgang Böhmer
- Succeeded by: Sven Schulze

President of the Bundesrat
- In office 1 November 2020 – 31 October 2021
- First Vice President: Dietmar Woidke
- Preceded by: Dietmar Woidke
- Succeeded by: Bodo Ramelow

Minister for Economics and Labour of Saxony-Anhalt
- In office 24 April 2006 – 19 April 2011
- Minister-President: Wolfgang Böhmer
- Preceded by: Horst Rehberger
- Succeeded by: Birgitta Wolff

Member of the Landtag of Saxony-Anhalt for Wittenberg (Dessau-Roßlau-Wittenberg; 2011–2021)
- Incumbent
- Assumed office 19 April 2011
- Preceded by: Kurt Brumme

Personal details
- Born: Reiner Erich Haseloff; 19 February 1954 (age 72) Bülzig, Bezirk Halle, East Germany (now Saxony-Anhalt, Germany)
- Party: Christian Democratic Union (since 1990)
- Other political affiliations: Christian Democratic Union (East) (1976–1990)
- Education: Dresden University of Technology; Humboldt University of Berlin (Dipl., PhD)
- Website: Official website

Reiner Erich Haseloff (born 19 February 1954) is a German politician who served as the Minister-President of Saxony-Anhalt from 2011 to 2026. He served a one-year term as President of the Bundesrat from 2020 to 2021. From 2022 to 2026, he was the longest-serving minister-president of the German states.

== Political career ==
Reiner Haseloff joined the then bloc party CDU of the GDR in 1976. He has been a member of the state executive of the CDU Saxony-Anhalt since 1990 and was deputy district administrator of the Wittenberg district from 1990 to 1992.

From 2004 to 2012, Haseloff was deputy state chairman of the CDU. Since December 2008 he has been a member of the CDU federal executive committee. From 2002 to 2006, Haseloff served as State Secretary at the State Ministry for Economic Affairs and Labour under minister Horst Rehberger in the first cabinet of Minister President Wolfgang Böhmer. In 2006, he succeeded Rehberger and became a member of Böhmer's second cabinet.

In the negotiations to form a coalition government of the Christian Democrats (CDU together with the Bavarian CSU) and the Free Democratic Party (FDP) following the 2009 federal elections, Haseloff was part of the CDU/CSU delegation in the working group on labour and social affairs, led by Ronald Pofalla and Dirk Niebel.

=== Minister President of Saxony-Anhalt, 2011–2026 ===
When Böhmer announced his resignation ahead of the 2011 state elections, Haseloff was the candidate of the CDU. He had already gained national attention by proposing that unemployed people who had no job prospects work for the public interest, a plan that since then has been adopted in a number of federal states.

From 2014 and 2016, Haseloff was one of the members of Germany's temporary National Commission on the Disposal of Radioactive Waste.

During the European migrant crisis, in November 2015, Haseloff kept distance to Angela Merkel by proposing an "upper limit" (German: Obergrenze) of refugees as the CSU party did, for the state as well as on federal level. At the same time he didn't join a proposal of fellow CDU 2016 state election campaigners Julia Klöckner and Guido Wolf for flexible daily quotas for refugee inflows into Germany, which was a step beyond Merkel's "open-doors" policy but not as far as the CSU party, reportedly in deference to his SPD coalition partner in the state government. Haseloff said, the chancellor "elaborately fought for a European solution" in the refugee crisis, but this was "out of sight".

In the 2016 state elections, Haseloff was able to keep power in Saxony-Anhalt, with his CDU taking approximately 29 percent of the vote and thereby remaining the largest party in the state parliament, but faced a strong AfD right wing opposition. Haseloff stated after the elections that "the actual rise, which came for the AfD in the polls has a city name: It's Cologne." He explained that the rise of the votes for his party in the state came because "we at least did nothing wrong as a Christian Democratic Union here in Saxony-Anhalt." Following the elections, Saxony-Anhalt became the first of the German states to be governed by a triple coalition of CDU, SPD and the Green Party. On 25 April 2016, Haseloff was re-elected in parliament as minister president of the state during a second ballot, where he managed to gain one vote more than the coalition majority.

=== Role in national politics ===
As one of the state's representatives at the Bundesrat, Haseloff serves on the Committee on Foreign Affairs.

Within his party, Haseloff has been part of the CDU's national leadership team around successive chairwomen Angela Merkel (2008–2018) and Annegret Kramp-Karrenbauer (2018–2021) since 2008. He served as a CDU delegate to the Federal Convention for the purpose of electing the President of Germany in 2009, 2010, 2012, 2017 and 2022.

In the negotiations to form a so-called Grand Coalition under Chancellor Merkel following the 2013 federal elections, Haseloff was part of the CDU/CSU delegation's leadership team. The Christian Social Union in Bavaria (CSU) only runs in that state while the CDU is absent there, with both parties cooperating on national level since the 1940s. Following the 2017 national elections, Haseloff was part of the 19-member delegation of the CDU in the – unsuccessful – negotiations to form a Jamaica coalition (after the black, yellow, green flag) with the Free Democratic Party (FDP) and the Green Party.

Since 2022, Haseloff has been chairing an internal CDU working group in charge of drafting recommendation on reforming Germany's public broadcasting.

== Other activities ==
- Deutsches Museum, Member of the Board of Trustees
- Central Committee of German Catholics, Member
- Committee for the preparation of the Reformation anniversary 2017, Member of the Board of Trustees
- European Chemical Regions Network (ECRN), President (2006-2011)
- International Building Exhibition (IBA) Urban Redevelopment 2010, Member of the Board of Trustees

== Political positions ==
Ahead of the 2021 national elections, Haseloff endorsed Markus Söder as the Christian Democrats' joint candidate to succeed Chancellor Angela Merkel.

== Distinctions ==
- Holy See: Knight of the Order of the Holy Sepulchre (2003)
- Grand Cross of the Order of Merit of the Federal Republic of Germany (2023)

Political offices
Preceded by Wolfgang Böhmer	Minister President of Saxony-Anhalt; 2011–present	Incumbent
Preceded by Dietmar Woidke	President of the Bundesrat; 2020–2021	Succeeded by Bodo Ramelow
