= Friedrichshain-Kreuzberg 6 =

State electoral district of Germany

- Electoral district for the Berlin House of Representatives
- Friedrichshain-Kreuzberg 6 in 2026
- District: Friedrichshain-Kreuzberg
- Electorate: 27,729 (2023)

Current electoral district
- Party: Green
- Member: Julian Schwarze

Friedrichshain-Kreuzberg 6 is an electoral constituency (German: Wahlkreis) represented in the House of Representatives of Berlin. It elects one member via first-past-the-post voting.

== Geography ==
The constituency will be abolished at the 2026 election.

There were 27,729 eligible voters in 2023.

== Members ==
Election	Member	Party	%
2021	Julian Schwarze	Green	38.6
2023	Julian Schwarze	Green	39.5

== Election results ==
=== 2023 repeat election ===
Changes denoted below for the 2023 election are compared to the notional result forecasted for the 2016 election. The 2021 election was declared invalid.

State election (2023): Friedrichshain-Kreuzberg 6
Notes:	Blue background denotes the winner of the electorate vote. Pink background denotes a candidate elected from their party list. Yellow background denotes an electorate win by a list member, or other incumbent. A ✓ or ✗ denotes status of any incumbent, win or lose respectively.						
Party	Candidate	Votes	%	±%	Party votes	%	±%
Greens	Julian Schwarze	7,525	39.5	▲7.3	6,957	36.5	▲7.3
Left	Kerstin Wolter	3,746	19.7	▼2.3	3,827	20.1	▼3.4
SPD	Sven Heinemann	2,519	13.2	▼4.1	2,445	12.8	▼3.7
CDU	Max Kindler	2,408	12.6	▲5.2	2,319	12.2	▲4.3
PARTEI	Jens Glatzer	812	4.3	▼1.3	543	2.8	▼2.4
FDP	Diana Flemig	708	3.7	▲0.5	797	4.2	Steady
AfD	Alexander Sell	647	3.4	▼3.0	650	3.4	▼2.8
Tierschutzpartei	Dario Levin Angelo Stänicke	491	2.6		436	2.3	▲0.8
Volt					325	1.7	
Klimaliste					119	0.6	
dieBasis	Hugo Sturm	104	0.5		82	0.4	
du.					81	0.4	
Pirates					79	0.4	▼3.5
Bergpartei, die ÜberPartei					56	0.3	▼0.3
Mieterpartei					53	0.3	
Independent	Andrea Kirschtowski	53	0.3				
Humanists					40	0.2	
DKP					36	0.2	Steady
Gray Panthers					34	0.2	▼0.2
Team Todenhöfer					34	0.2	
ÖDP	Oskar-Wolf Meier	46	0.2		27	0.1	
Verjüngungsforschung					25	0.1	
The Grays					22	0.1	
FW					22	0.1	
Bildet Berlin!					15	0.1	
SGP					11	0.1	Steady
The Pinks/Alliance 21					9	0.0	
NPD					6	0.0	▼0.1
LKR					3	0.0	▼0.1
BüSo					3	0.0	
Informal votes		77			76		
Total valid votes		19,059			19,056		
Turnout		19,148	69.1	▲13.8			
Greens win new seat	Majority	3,779	19.8				

=== 2021 election (annulled) ===
The election in 2021 was annulled and rerun in 2023.

All change figures are notional, as this seat was created for the 2021 election.

State election (2021): Friedrichshain-Kreuzberg 6
Notes:	Blue background denotes the winner of the electorate vote. Pink background denotes a candidate elected from their party list. Yellow background denotes an electorate win by a list member, or other incumbent. A ✓ or ✗ denotes status of any incumbent, win or lose respectively.						
Party	Candidate	Votes	%	±%	Party votes	%	±%
Greens	Julian Schwarze	8,988	38.6	▲6.5	8,218	35.2	▲5.9
Left	Kerstin Wolter	5,241	22.5	▲0.6	5,392	23.1	▼0.4
SPD	Sven Heinemann	3,055	13.1	▼4.1	2,883	12.3	▼4.2
CDU	Max Kindler	1,842	7.9	▲0.4	1,671	7.1	▼0.7
FDP	Diana Flemig	1,279	5.5	▲2.3	1,374	5.9	▲1.7
PARTEI	Jens Glatzer	1,133	4.9	▼0.7	776	3.3	▼1.9
AfD	Alexander Sell	683	2.9	▼3.4	688	2.9	▼3.3
Volt					498	2.1	
Tierschutzpartei	Dario Levin Angelo Stänicke	547	2.4		435	1.9	▲0.4
dieBasis	Hugo Sturm	350	1.5		270	1.2	
Klimaliste					243	1.0	
Pirates					145	0.6	▼3.3
FW					104	0.4	
du.					95	0.4	
Bergpartei, die ÜberPartei					89	0.4	▼0.2
Team Todenhöfer					83	0.4	
Independent	Andrea Kirschtowski	79	0.3				
The Grays					71	0.3	
Humanists					67	0.3	
Gray Panthers					41	0.2	▼0.2
APT					39	0.2	
Mieterpartei					39	0.2	
Verjüngungsforschung					36	0.2	▲0.1
DKP					30	0.1	Steady
Bildet Berlin!					29	0.1	
ÖDP	Oskar-Wolf Meier	58	0.2		27	0.1	Steady
The Pinks/Alliance 21					10	0.0	
LKR					6	0.0	▼0.1
SGP					6	0.0	▼0.1
BüSo					5	0.0	Steady
NPD					2	0.0	▼0.1
Informal votes		248			134		
Total valid votes		23,255			23,372		
Turnout		23,555	84.5	▲29.2			
Greens win new seat	Majority	3,747	16.1				

== See also ==
- Politics of Berlin
- House of Representatives of Berlin
