= 2021 Saxony-Anhalt state election =

German state election

- 6 June 2021

All 97 seats in the Landtag of Saxony-Anhalt (including 14 overhang and leveling seats) 49 seats needed for a majority
- Turnout: 1,079,045 (60.3%) ▼0.8%
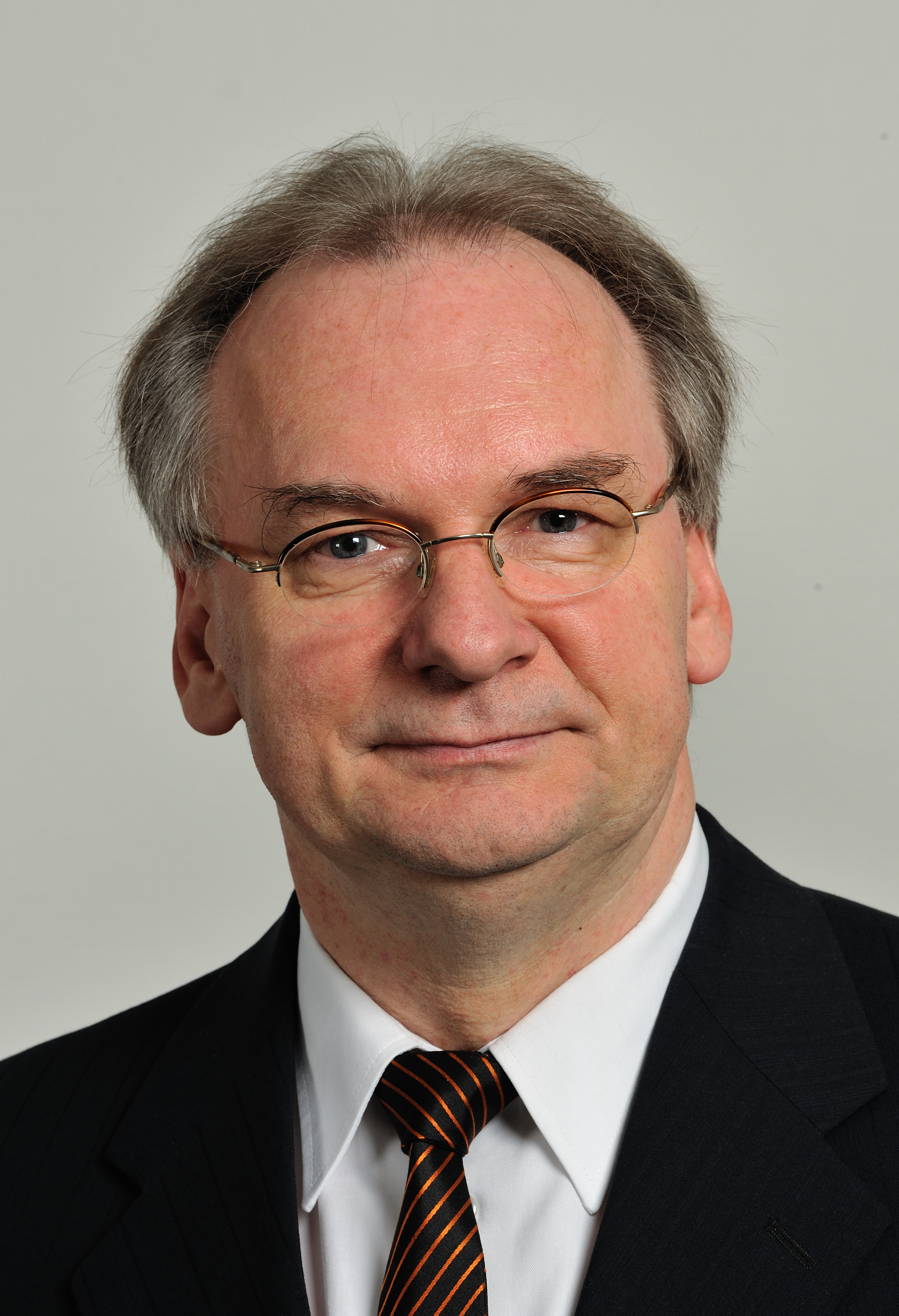

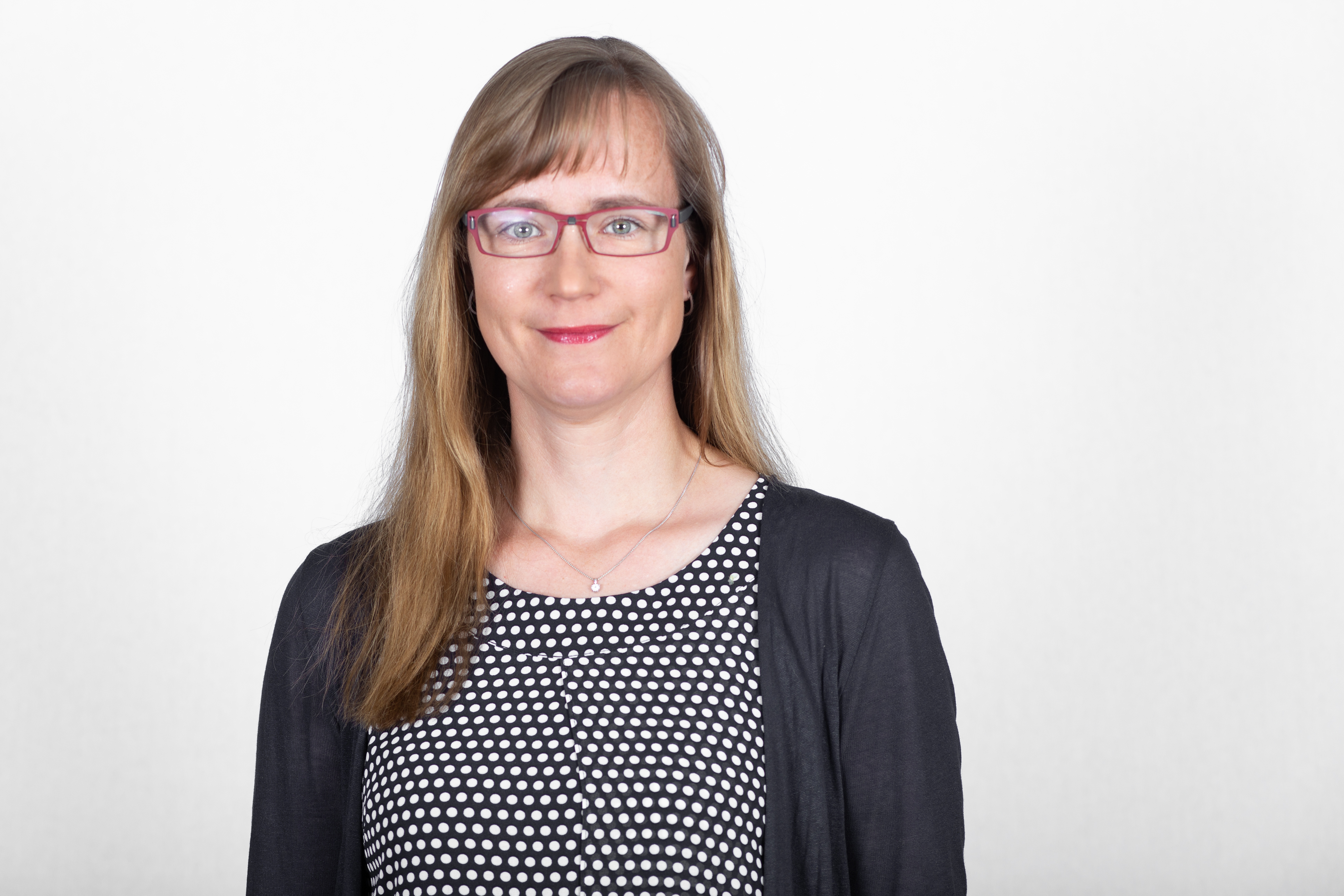

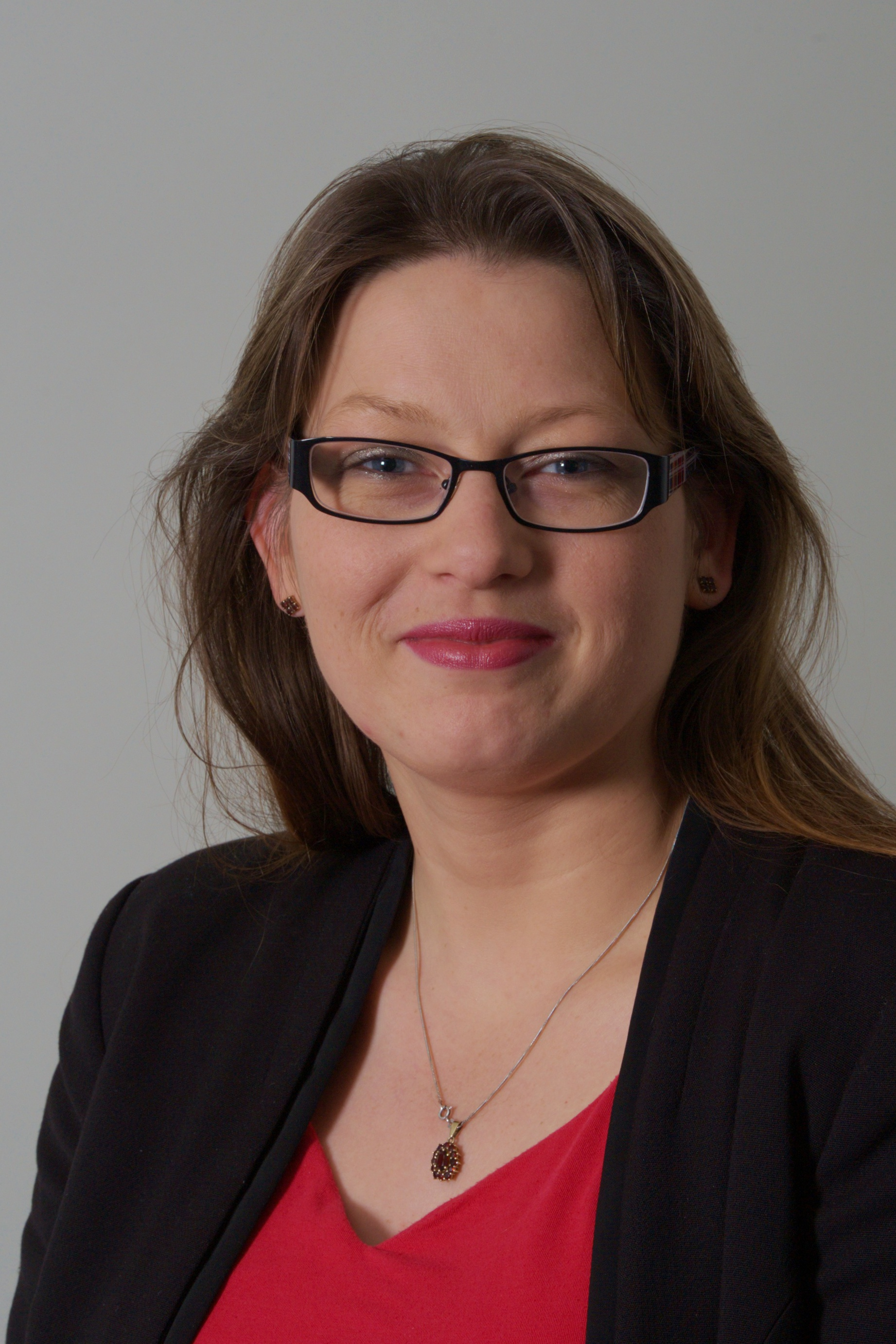

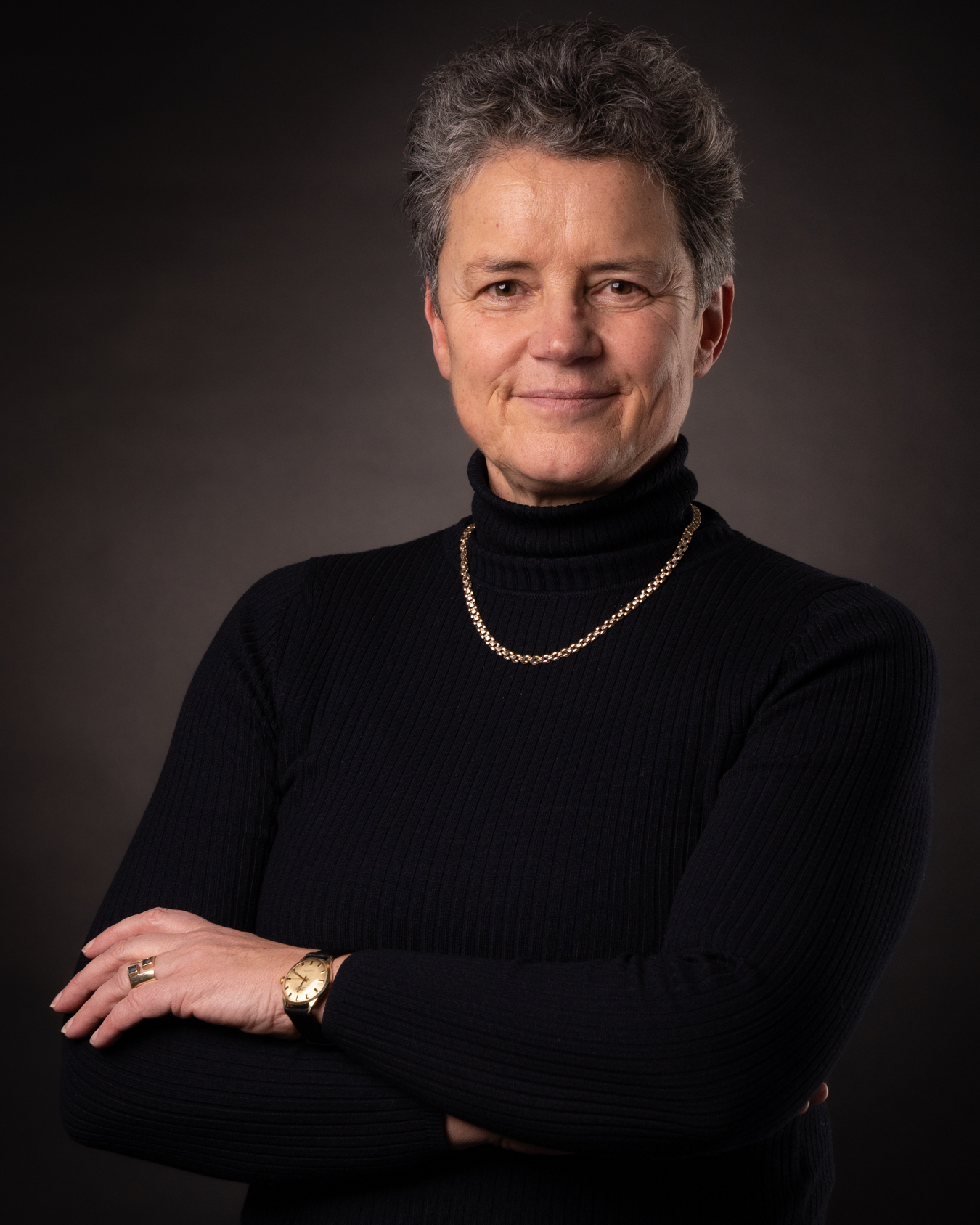

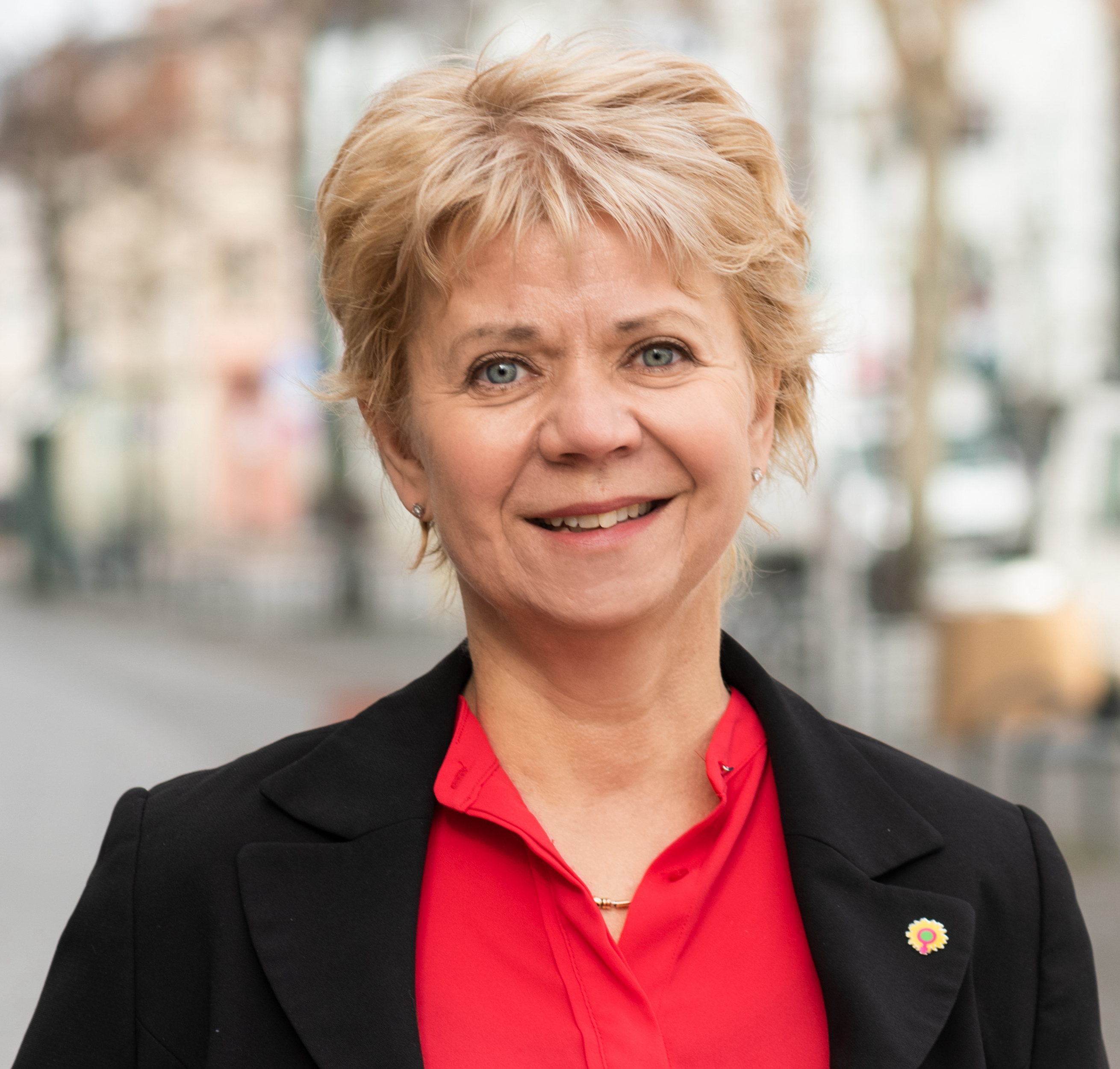
	First party	Second party	Third party
Leader	Reiner Haseloff	Oliver Kirchner	Eva von Angern
Party	CDU	AfD	Left
Last election	30 seats, 29.8%	25 seats, 24.3%	16 seats, 16.3%
Seats won	40	23	12
Seat change	▲10	▼2	▼4
Popular vote	394,810	221,487	116,927
Percentage	37.1%	20.8%	11.0%
Swing	▲7.4%	▼3.4%	▼5.3%
	Fourth party	Fifth party	Sixth party
Leader	Katja Pähle	Lydia Hüskens	Cornelia Lüddemann
Party	SPD	FDP	Greens
Last election	11 seats, 10.6%	0 seats, 4.9%	5 seats, 5.2%
Seats won	9	7	6
Seat change	▼2	▲7	▲1
Popular vote	89,475	68,277	63,145
Percentage	8.4%	6.4%	5.9%
Swing	▼2.2%	▲1.6%	▲0.8%
- Results for the single-member constituencies
Government before election
Second Haseloff cabinet
CDU–SPD–Green
Government after election
Third Haseloff cabinet
CDU–SPD–FDP

The 2021 Saxony-Anhalt state election was held on 6 June 2021 to elect the 8th Landtag of Saxony-Anhalt. The outgoing government was coalition of the Christian Democratic Union (CDU), Social Democratic Party (SPD), and The Greens, led by Minister-President Reiner Haseloff.

The CDU won an unexpectedly strong 37.1% of votes, an increase of 7.4 percentage points. The opposition Alternative for Germany (AfD) finished on 20.8%, a decline of 3.4 percentage points. The Left and SPD each suffered their worst ever results in the state, recording 11.0% and 8.4% respectively. The Free Democratic Party (FDP), which narrowly failed to re-enter the Landtag in 2016, won 6.4% of votes and 7 seats. The Greens finished on an unexpectedly low 5.9%, only a slight improvement from their previous result.

Going into the election, the CDU trailed the AfD in some polls, with most others showing a neck-to-neck race, with the CDU sitting at around 30 % support. The unexpected CDU sweep – improving their 2016 result and winning a plurality in every district of the state, though they narrowly lost the Zeitz constituency – was largely attributed to the personal popularity of long-time Minister-President Haseloff, who, at the time, was the Minister-President with the highest favorability ratings. This allowed him to carry the CDU to victory against the poor showing in the polls of the federal CDU, largely resulting from developments in their campaign in the then-upcoming federal election. The AfD's leader Oliver Kirchner on the other hand was barely known to the public, with polls showing he would garner single-digit support if the Minister-President was elected directly.

On 6 July, the CDU, SPD, and FDP began coalition negotiations. The three parties presented a draft coalition agreement on 9 August, which was later approved by each party's membership. The coalition, dubbed "Germany coalition" due to the coalition parties' colors, was übergroß (larger than necessary for a majority), since the CDU and SPD alone would have held a single-seat majority in the Landtag. The last übergroß coalition, popular in times of crises, for example in West Berlin in the post-WWII years, was formed in Hamburg in 1970. Nevertheless, the Landtag didn't elect Haseloff on the first ballot, which some commentators attributed to right-wing dissent within the CDU faction. Haseloff was re-elected Minister-President on 16 September on the second ballot in the Landtag.

== Election date ==
The Landtag is elected for five years, with its term commencing when the new Landtag first meets. Election must take place between 58 and 62 months after the start of the legislative period. In November 2019, the state government announced that the election would take place on 6 June 2021.

== Electoral system ==
The Landtag is elected via mixed-member proportional representation. 41 members are elected in single-member constituencies via first-past-the-post voting. 42 members are then allocated using compensatory proportional representation. Voters have two votes: the "first vote" for candidates in single-member constituencies, and the "second vote" for party lists, which are used to fill the proportional seats. The minimum size of the Landtag is 83 members, but if overhang seats are present, proportional leveling seats will be added to ensure proportionality. An electoral threshold of 5% of valid votes is applied to the Landtag; parties that fall below this threshold are ineligible to receive seats.

== Background ==
In the previous election held on 13 March 2016, the CDU remained the largest party with 29.8% of votes cast, a decline of 2.7 percentage points. Alternative for Germany (AfD) contested its first election in Saxony-Anhalt, winning 24.3%. The Left fell from second to third place with 16.3%, a decline of 7.4 points. The SPD lost half its voteshare, falling to 10.6%. The Greens narrowly retained their seats with 5.2%.

The CDU had led a coalition with the SPD since 2011, but this government lost its majority in the election. The CDU subsequently formed a coalition with the SPD and Greens.

== Parties ==
The table below lists parties which were represented in the 7th Landtag of Saxony-Anhalt.

Name		Ideology	Lead candidate	2016 result	
Name		Ideology	Lead candidate	Votes (%)	Seats
CDU	Christian Democratic Union of Germany; Christlich Demokratische Union Deutschlands	Christian democracy	Reiner Haseloff	29.8%	30 / 87
AfD	Alternative for Germany; Alternative für Deutschland	Right-wing populism	Oliver Kirchner	24.3%	25 / 87
Linke	The Left; Die Linke	Democratic socialism	Eva von Angern	16.3%	16 / 87
SPD	Social Democratic Party of Germany; Sozialdemokratische Partei Deutschlands	Social democracy	Katja Pähle	10.6%	11 / 87
Grüne	Alliance 90/The Greens; Bündnis 90/Die Grünen	Green politics	Cornelia Lüddemann	5.2%	5 / 87

== Campaign ==
=== Lead candidates ===
On 10 July 2020, SPD parliamentary group leader Katja Pähle was elected as the SPD's lead candidate for the election, defeating challenger Roger Stöcker. In a vote by the party membership, Pähle won 834 votes (52.5%) to Stöcker's 652 (41.0%).

On 12 July 2020, The Left party executive nominated deputy Landtag leader Eva von Angern as their lead candidate for the election. Some within the party disapproved of the executive nominating a preferred nominee ahead of time, and desired an open contest between candidates at the conference. The party's district associations in Jerichower Land, Saalekreis, and Magdeburg signed an open letter expressing their disappointment. Party chairman Stefan Gebhardt stated he took the criticism seriously, and that the executive's announcement was simply a suggestion. Angern was elected as lead candidate with 85.6% of votes at a party conference on 30 January 2021.

On 5 September 2020, the Greens party congress elected Landtag group leader Cornelia Lüddemann as their lead candidate for the election.

Polls 2016–2021

On 21 September 2020, the CDU confirmed incumbent Minister-President Reiner Haseloff as its lead candidate. In prior months, state party leader Holger Stahlknecht had stated his desire to become top candidate if Haseloff chose not to seek another term as Minister-President. Stahlknecht affirmed his support for Haseloff after the September announcement.

The Free Democratic Party, which narrowly failed to enter the Landtag in 2016, elected deputy leader Lydia Hüskens as its lead candidate on 26 September 2020.

On 20 December 2020, AfD parliamentary group leader Oliver Kirchner was nominated as his party's lead candidate for the election. He ran unopposed, winning 361 of 416 votes at a party conference.

== Opinion polling ==
=== Party polling ===
Polling firm	Fieldwork date	Sample size	CDU	AfD	Linke	SPD	Grüne	FDP	FW	Others	Lead
2021 state election	6 Jun 2021	–	37.1	20.8	11.0	8.4	5.9	6.4	3.1	7.2	16.3
INSA	1–4 Jun 2021	1,132	27	26	12	10	8	7	3	7	1
Forschungsgruppe Wahlen	2–3 Jun 2021	1,017	30	23	11.5	10	9	6.5	3	7	7
Wahlkreisprognose	22–31 May 2021	–	28.5	24.5	10.5	11	8	7	3	7.5	4
Forschungsgruppe Wahlen	25–27 May 2021	1,008	29	23	11	10	9	8	3	7	6
Infratest dimap	25–26 May 2021	1,249	28	24	10	11	9	8	3	7	4
INSA	17–23 May 2021	1,000	25	26	13	10	11	8	–	7	1
INSA	20–27 Apr 2021	1,042	26	24	13	10	12	6	–	9	2
Infratest dimap	16–21 Apr 2021	1,202	27	20	12	12	11	8	–	10	7
INSA	19–25 Jan 2021	1,084	30	23	16	10	9	5	–	7	7
INSA	23–30 Nov 2020	1,079	29	23	17	10	10	4	–	7	6
GMS	15–29 Jul 2020	1,003	33	19	16	12	10	4	1	5	14
Infratest dimap	28 May–3 Jun 2020	1,003	34	19	16	13	8	4	–	6	15
INSA	2–16 Mar 2020	1,005	25	25	18	11	11	4	–	6	Tie
Infratest dimap	21–25 Aug 2018	1,000	28	21	19	14	6	8	–	4	7
CONOSCOPE	30 Jan–8 Mar 2018	1,100	35	15	20	16	5	6	–	3	15
Infratest dimap	12–17 Jun 2017	1,000	40	13	20	13	6	5	–	3	20
Infratest dimap	15–19 Nov 2016	1,000	33	22	18	15	5	–	–	7	11
2016 state election	13 Mar 2016	–	29.8	24.3	16.3	10.6	5.2	4.9	2.2	6.8	5.5

=== Minister-President polling ===
Polling firm	Fieldwork date	Sample size			None/Unsure	Lead
Polling firm	Fieldwork date	Sample size	Haseloff CDU	Kirchner AfD	None/Unsure	Lead
Forschungsgruppe Wahlen	2–3 Jun 2021	1,017	68	9	23	59
Forschungsgruppe Wahlen	25–27 May 2021	1,008	68	7	25	61
Infratest dimap	21–25 Aug 2018	1,000	56	10	16	46

=== Preferred coalition ===
Polling firm	Fieldwork date	Sample size	Assessment	CDU SPD FDP	CDU SPD Grüne	CDU Grüne FDP	CDU AfD
Forschungsgruppe Wahlen	25–27 May 2021	1,008	Positive	37	32	19	14
Forschungsgruppe Wahlen	25–27 May 2021	1,008	Negative	33	48	60	76

=== Position in government ===
Polling firm	Fieldwork date	Sample size	Assessment	CDU	AfD	Linke	SPD	Grüne	FDP
INSA	May 2021	?	Party of the Minister-President	26.6	10.9	5.3	8.2	5.9	–
INSA	May 2021	?	Party of government	21.0	12.0	22.2	32.1	24.3	22.0

== Results ==
Party	Constituency				Party list				Total seats	+/–
Party	Votes	%	+/–	Seats	Votes	%	+/–	Seats	Total seats	+/–
Christian Democratic Union (CDU)	362,334	34.13	+4.58	40	394,810	37.12	+7.37	0	40	+10
Alternative for Germany (AfD)	231,871	21.84	–1.28	1	221,487	20.82	–3.45	22	23	–2
The Left (Linke)	135,421	12.76	–5.91	0	116,927	10.99	–5.33	12	12	–4
Social Democratic Party (SPD)	116,504	10.98	–3.31	0	89,475	8.41	–2.22	9	9	–2
Free Democratic Party (FDP)	70,714	6.66	+1.19	0	68,277	6.42	+1.56	7	7	+7
Alliance 90/The Greens (Grüne)	60,495	5.70	+0.42	0	63,145	5.94	+0.76	6	6	+1
Free Voters (FW)	57,527	5.42	+3.35	0	33,291	3.13	+0.97	0	0	±0
Grassroots Democratic Party of Germany (dieBasis)	7,564	0.71	New	0	15,623	1.47	New	0	0	±0
Human Environment Animal Protection Party (Tierschutzpartei)	1,056	0.10	+0.10	0	15,279	1.44	–0.04	0	0	±0
Garden Party (Gardenpartei)	3,216	0.30	+0.08	0	8,583	0.81	+0.38	0	0	±0
Die PARTEI	3,909	0.37	+0.26	0	7,768	0.73	+0.20	0	0	±0
Animal Protection Here!	0	0.00	New	0	6,238	0.59	New	0	0	±0
Animal Protection Alliance (Tierschutzallianz)	4,518	0.43	+0.19	0	5,109	0.48	–0.56	0	0	±0
Party for Health Research (PfV)	0	0.00	New	0	3,951	0.37	New	0	0	±0
Pirate Party Germany (Piraten)	0	0.00	New	0	3,815	0.36	New	0	0	±0
National Democratic Party (NPD)	160	0.02	+0.02	0	2,888	0.27	–1.62	0	0	±0
WiR2020	0	0.00	New	0	1,649	0.16	New	0	0	±0
Free Citizens of Central Germany	2,932	0.28	–0.16	0	1,613	0.15	–0.22	0	0	±0
The Humanists (PdH)	0	0.00	New	0	1,405	0.13	New	0	0	±0
Ecological Democratic Party (ÖDP)	145	0.01	New	0	1,062	0.10	New	0	0	±0
Klimaliste	0	0.00	New	0	827	0.08	New	0	0	±0
Liberal Conservative Reformers (WB)	0	0.00	±0.00	0	475	0.04	–0.83	0	0	±0
Independents	3,153	0.30	–0.10	0	0	0.00	0	0	0	±0
Total	1,061,519	100.00	–	41	1,063,697	100.00	–	56	97	–
Valid votes	1,061,519	98.38			1,063,697	98.58				
Invalid/blank votes	17,526	1.62			15,348	1.42				
Total votes	1,079,045	100.00			1,079,045	100.00				
Registered voters/turnout	1,788,955	60.32	–0.79		1,788,955	60.32	–0.79			
Source: State Returning Officer

Popular vote
CDU	37.12%
AfD	20.82%
LINKE	10.99%
SPD	8.41%
FDP	6.42%
GRÜNE	5.94%
FW	3.13%
Other	7.17%

Landtag seats
CDU	41.24%
AfD	23.71%
LINKE	12.37%
SPD	9.28%
FDP	7.22%
GRÜNE	6.19%

CDU vote

AfD vote

Linke vote

SPD vote

FDP vote

Green vote

FW vote

== Aftermath ==
The CDU's clear victory was not predicted by opinion polling, which suggested that the party was likely to win a plurality, but would not exceed 30% of the vote. Likewise, the AfD and Greens did more poorly than expected. Off the heels of poor results in the March state elections, the result was perceived as a success for the CDU nationally. However, commentators pointed to the personal popularity of Minister-President Haseloff, who they noted had distanced himself from federal chairman Armin Laschet, endorsing rival Markus Söder during the contest for the Chancellor candidacy in April. In addition, the Saxony-Anhalt branch of AfD is considered to be quite extreme even by national party's standards and had been under surveillance since June 2021.

The incumbent governing "Kenya coalition" of the CDU, SPD, and Greens was returned with an increased majority of 55 seats; the CDU and SPD alone held a slim majority of 49 seats. Other options included a "Jamaica coalition" of the CDU, FDP, and Greens (53 seats), as well as the previously untested "Germany coalition" of the CDU, SPD, and FDP (56 seats). Minister-President Haseloff stated that he would hold government discussions with "all democratic parties", and ruled out a coalition with the AfD or The Left.

=== Government formation ===
The Greens ruled out renewing their coalition with the CDU and SPD, stating that they did not wish to enter a government in which they were not mathematically necessary. The SPD demanded that the next government implement free daycare and provide more funds for municipalities or hospitals where possible. The FDP demanded a reduction of bureaucracy in order to streamline the procurement law.

On 7 July, the CDU, SPD, and FDP announced they would enter negotiations for a coalition government. On 9 August, the three parties announced that a draft coalition agreement had been finalised.

All three parties held membership ballots to approve the agreement. On 4 September, the SPD announced that the agreement had been passed with 63.4% approval. This was followed on 10 September by approval from 92.1% of CDU members and 98% of FDP members.

On 16 September, the Landtag re-elected Haseloff as Minister-President and invested his new cabinet. Haseloff unexpectedly failed to be elected on the first ballot, winning only 48 of the necessary 49 votes. His coalition holds 56 seats in total. On the second ballot, he was elected with 53 votes in favour to 43 against, with one abstention.
