= Eva von Angern =

German lawyer and politician of The Left

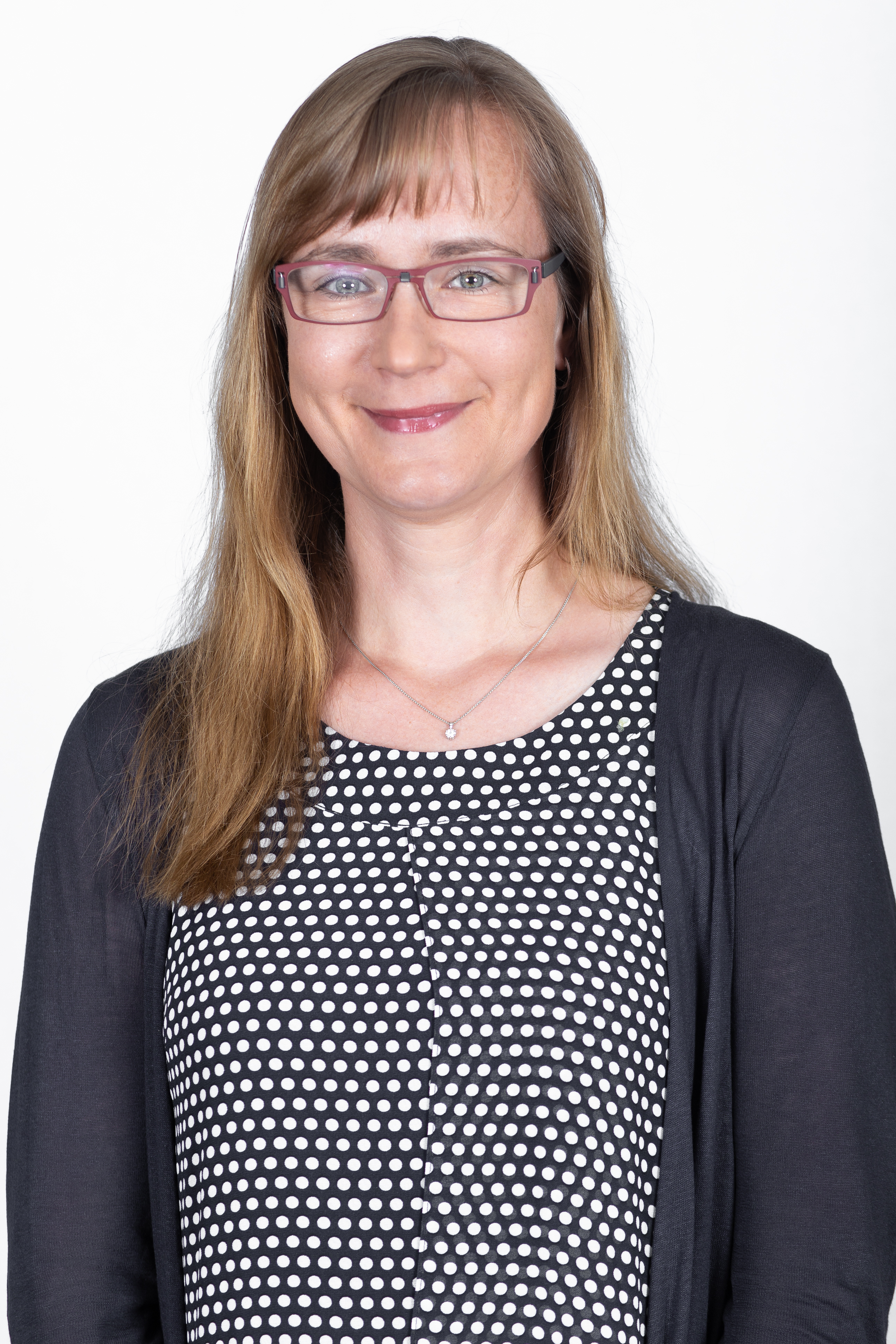
- Von Angern in 2020

Leader of The Left in the Landtag of Saxony-Anhalt
- Incumbent
- Assumed office 1 December 2020 Serving with Thomas Lippmann (until 6 June 2021)
- Preceded by: Thomas Lippmann

Deputy Leader of The Left in the Landtag of Saxony-Anhalt
- In office 2014 – 1 December 2020

Member of the Landtag of Saxony-Anhalt
- Incumbent
- Assumed office 16 May 2002
- Constituency: List

Personal details
- Born: Eva von Angern; 1 December 1976 (age 49) Magdeburg, East Germany
- Party: The Left (2007–present); PDS (1996–2007)
- Children: 3

Eva von Angern (born 1 December 1976) is a German lawyer and politician of The Left. She has been a member of the Landtag of Saxony-Anhalt since 2002, and chairwoman of the Left parliamentary group since December 2020. Previously, she was deputy chairwoman since 2014. She was the party's lead candidate for the 2021 state election.

== Personal life ==
Von Angern was born on 1 December 1976 in Magdeburg, East Germany. Her mother was a history teacher and her father was a policeman of Deutsche Volkspolizei. From 1983 to 1991 she attended the POS Dr. Richard Sorge, and graduated from Wilhelm-Raabe-Gymnasium in 1995. She spent time as a service employee at CinemaxX Magdeburg. Von Angern completed her study of law at the Martin Luther University of Halle-Wittenberg in 2001; at the end of her legal traineeship at the Naumburg Higher Regional Court, she passed the second state examination in 2005. She has worked as a lawyer in Magdeburg since 2006.

Eva von Angern is non-denominational, married, and has three children. She chose to keep her maiden name after marriage, and belongs to the former noble family von Angern.

== Political career ==
Von Angern joined the Party of Democratic Socialism in 1996. She was deputy chairwoman of the Magdeburg branch of the party from 1998 to 2002, then chairwoman from 2002 to 2011. She was elected to the Landtag of Saxony-Anhalt in the 2002 state election, and re-elected in 2006, 2011, and 2016.

In 2014, she became deputy leader of The Left's parliamentary group. In 2020, she was nominated by the party executive as their preferred lead candidate for the 2021 state election. In December, she was elected co-chair of the party's Landtag group alongside incumbent Thomas Lippmann. She was confirmed as lead candidate at a party conference on 30 January 2021, winning 85.6% of votes.

The Left won 11.0% of votes in the state election, a decline of 5.3%, and remained in third place. Von Angern was elected sole chairwoman of the Left parliamentary group in the new Landtag.
