= Angern (disambiguation) =

Angern is a municipality in Saxony-Anhalt, Germany.

Angern may also refer to:

== Places ==
- Angern an der March, Austria
- Bujanov (German: Angern), Czech Republic
- Angerja (German: Angern), Estonia

== People ==
- Eva von Angern (born 1976), German politician
- Günther Angern (1893–1943), German army officer
