= Jens Bullerjahn =

German engineer and politician (1962–2022)

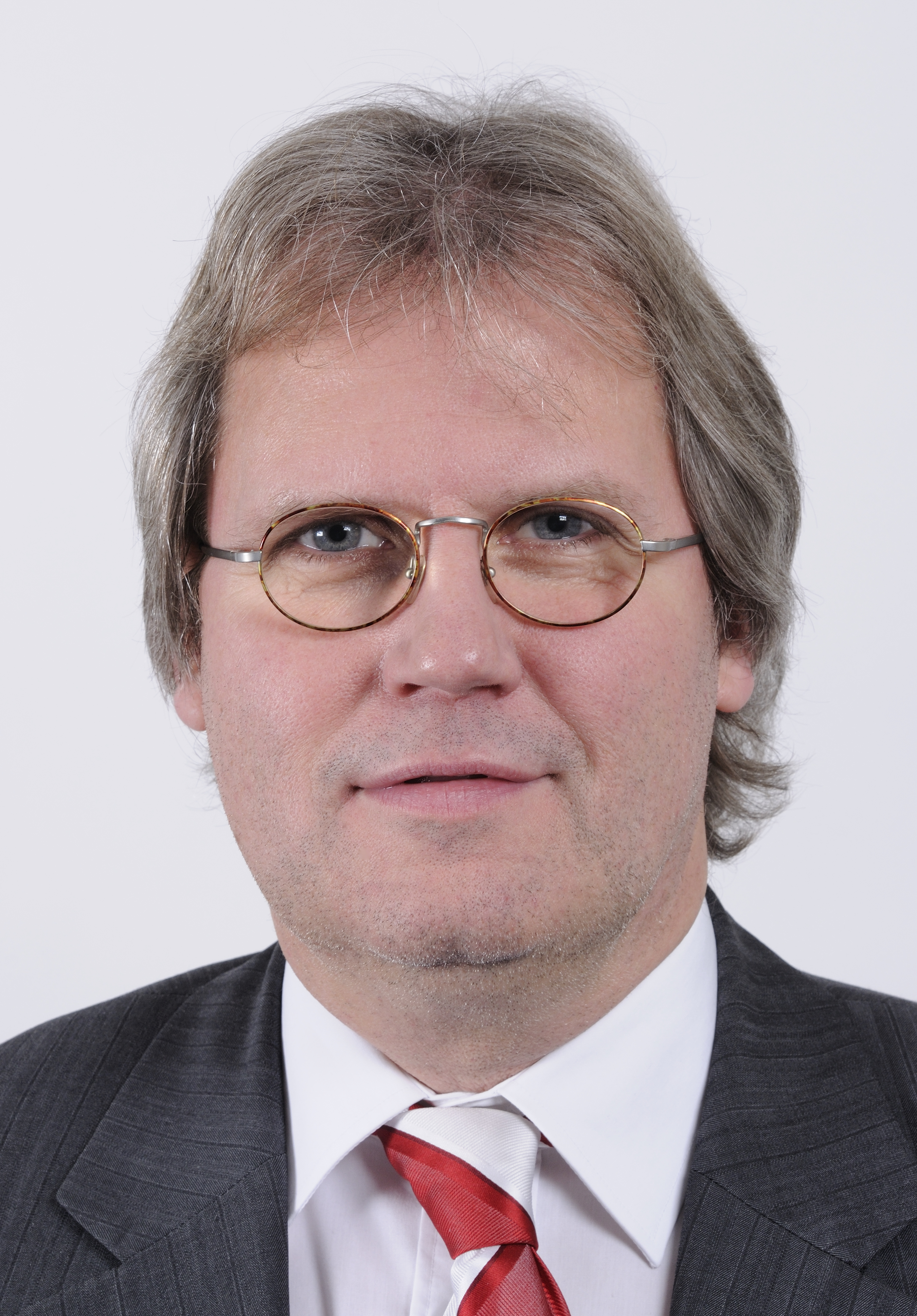
- Bullerjahn in 2012

Deputy Minister-President of Saxony-Anhalt
- In office 24 April 2006 – 25 April 2016
- Minister-President: Wolfgang Böhmer; Reiner Haseloff
- Preceded by: Horst Rehberger
- Succeeded by: Petra Grimm-Benne

Minister of Finance of Saxony-Anhalt
- In office 24 April 2006 – 25 April 2016
- Minister-President: Wolfgang Böhmer; Reiner Haseloff
- Preceded by: Karl-Heinz Paque
- Succeeded by: André Schröder

Leader of the Social Democratic Party in the Landtag of Saxony-Anhalt
- In office 22 June 2004 – 23 April 2006
- Whip: Norbert Bischoff
- Deputy: Krimhild Niestädt; Katrin Budde
- Preceded by: Manfred Püchel
- Succeeded by: Katrin Budde

Whip of the Social Democratic Party in the Landtag of Saxony-Anhalt
- In office 21 July 1994 – 22 June 2004
- Leader: Reinhard Höppner; Rüdiger Fikentscher; Manfred Püchel
- Preceded by: Tilman Tögel
- Succeeded by: Norbert Bischoff
Parliamentary constituencies
Member of the Landtag of Saxony-Anhalt
In office 19 April 2011 – 11 April 2016
Preceded by	Dirk Schatz (2007)
Succeeded by	Jens Diederichs
Constituency	Eisleben
In office 16 May 2002 – 19 April 2011
Preceded by	Multi-member district
Succeeded by	Multi-member district
Constituency	Social Democratic Party List
In office 21 July 1994 – 16 May 2002
Preceded by	Manfred Thon
Succeeded by	Eduard Jantos
Constituency	Eisleben
In office 28 October 1990 – 21 July 1994
Preceded by	Constituency established
Succeeded by	Multi-member district
Constituency	Social Democratic Party List

Personal details
- Born: 15 July 1962 Halle (Saale), Bezirk Halle, East Germany
- Died: 26 November 2022 (aged 60) Eisleben, Saxony-Anhalt, Germany
- Party: Social Democratic (from 1990)
- Other political affiliations: Social Democratic in GDR (1989–1990)
- Children: 2
- Occupation: Politician; engineer; author; consultant
- Awards: Order of Merit of Saxony-Anhalt

Jens Bullerjahn (15 July 1962 – 26 November 2022) was a German engineer and politician. A member of the Social Democratic Party, he served in the Landtag of Saxony-Anhalt from 1990 to 2016. From 2006 to 2016, he served concurrently as Vice-Minister-President and Minister of Finances of Saxony-Anhalt. He was able to reduce the state's indebtedness.

== Life and career ==
Born in Halle, Bullerjahn first trained to be an electrician from 1979 to 1981. From 1984, he studied electrical engineering at the Fachschule Magdeburg, graduating in 1987. He then worked as an engineer for process optimisation for the Mansfeld Kombinat until 1990.

=== Political career ===
Bullerjahn began his political career for the Social Democratic Party (SPD) at the communal level. He was a member of the SDP/SPD from 1989. Bullerjahn was elected a member of the Landtag of Saxony-Anhalt in 1990 and served until 2016. He was CEO of his party in the state parliament from 1993 to 2004. From 1994 to 2002, he stood for the "Magdeburger Modell", in which a SPD government without majority was tolerated by the left parties; it continued the state’s increase of indebtedness of the previous CDU government. In the 2002 election, the SPD performed poorly. Bullerjahn began to question his approach, and sought conversations with economic researchers (Wirtschaftsforscher). Over the next 1 1/2 years, he wrote a paper consisting of strategies for sustainable consolidation of finances by financial politics through 2020: Zukunftsorientierte Finanzpolitik bis 2020. Strategien für eine nachhaltige Konsolidierung, published in 2008.

Bullerjahn led the SPD in the 2006 election, but they reached only the third position. In the resulting coalition, he served as both Vice-Minister-President and Minister of Finances of Saxony-Anhalt. He led the SPD again in the 2011 election, and held both offices until 2016. As Minister of Finances, he pursued a strict savings policy (Sparpolitik), to not only avoid more debt, but to reduce the existing, which he managed over the last three years in office. He was criticised, also within his party, for reducing the number tax offices and prisons, and for providing less support of cultural and scientific institutions, among others.

In 2012, Bullerjahn was also elected president of the board of the Tarifgemeinschaft deutscher Länder, serving until 2016.

After retiring from his political posts, he worked as a consultant and book author.

=== Personal life ===
Bullerjahn was married; the couple had two sons.

In 2021, Bullerjahn was diagnosed with amytrophic lateral sclerosis, which he made public a year later. He died in a hospital in Eisleben on 26 November 2022, at age 60.

== Awards ==
- 2021 Order of Merit of Saxony-Anhalt

== Works ==
=== Papers ===
- Bullerjahn, Jens; Sozialdemokratische Partei Deutschlands (2008), Zukunftsorientierte Finanzpolitik bis 2020 : Strategien für eine nachhaltige Konsolidierung des Landeshaushaltes und der Kommunalhaushalte in Sachsen-Anhalt (in German), Halle, Saale, [Magdeburg]: Universitäts- und Landesbibliothek Sachsen-Anhalt, OCLC 838562201

=== Books ===
- Bullerjahn, Jens (2006). Quo vadis, Ostdeutschland? : zukunftsorientierte Politik für den Aufbau der neuen Länder (in German). [Germany]: Anderbeck. ISBN 3-937751-29-7. OCLC 71814086.
- ——; Renzsch, Wolfgang; Wagner, Ringo (2020). Deutschland - Ländersache?! : 30 Jahre deutsche Einheit und Föderalismus (in German). Magdeburg. ISBN 978-3-96250-590-5. OCLC 1226705542.

=== Thesis ===
- Bullerjahn, Jens (1995). Vergleich der Wirtschaftssysteme der Bundesrepublik Deutschland und der ehemaligen DDR (Literaturstudie) [Comparison of the economic systems of the Federal Republic of Germany and the former GDR] (in German). OCLC 1198502997.
