= Stefan Gebhardt =

German politician

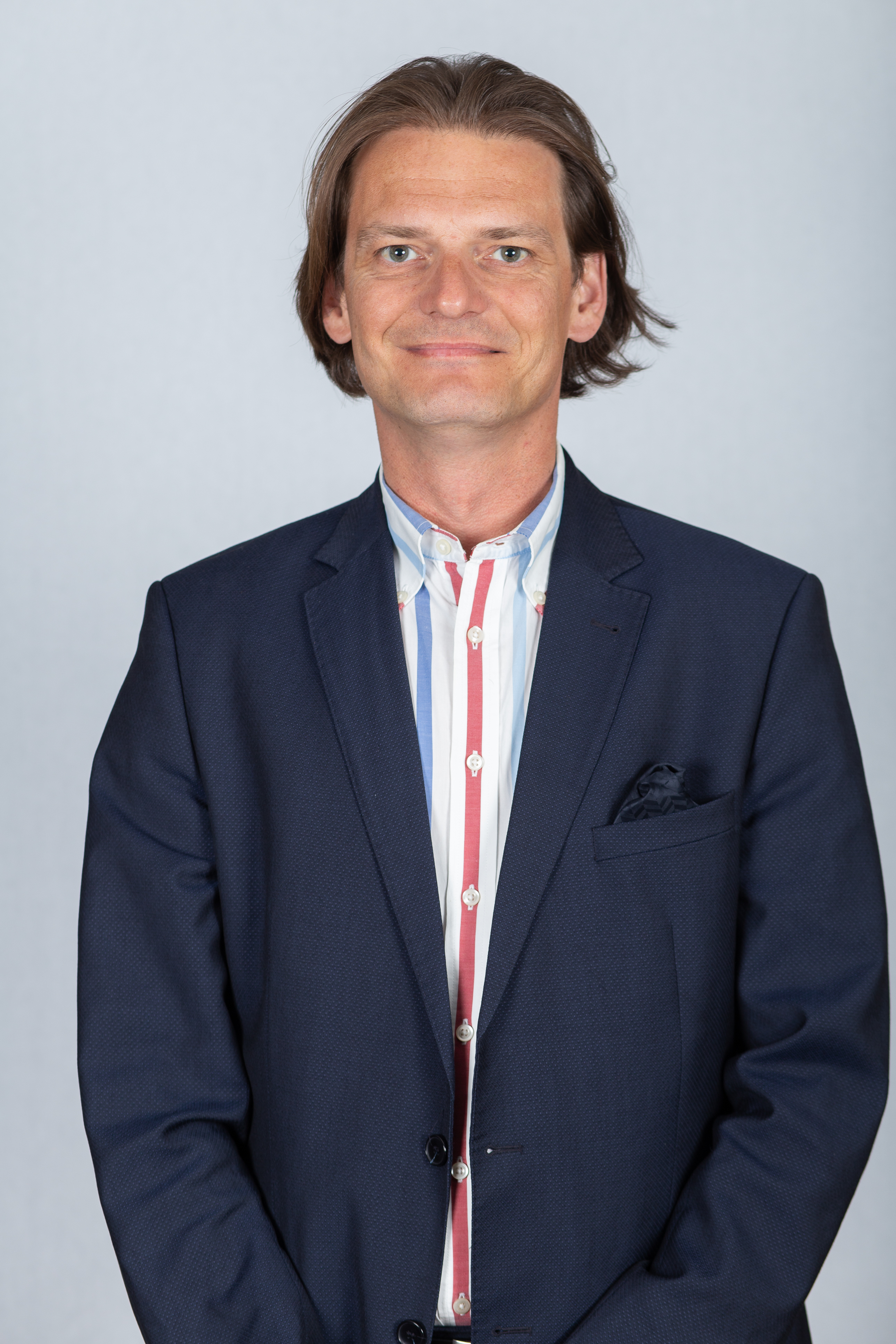
- Gebhardt in 2018

Leader of The Left in Saxony-Anhalt
- Incumbent
- Assumed office 29 June 2019
- Preceded by: Andreas Höppner

Member of the Landtag of Saxony-Anhalt
- Incumbent
- Assumed office 26 March 2006
- Constituency: Party list
- In office 26 April 1998 – 13 May 2005
- Constituency: Party list

Personal details
- Born: Stefan Gebhardt; 5 March 1974 (age 52) Wippra, East Germany
- Party: The Left (2007–present); PDS (before 2007)

Stefan Gebhardt (born 5 March 1974) is a German politician of The Left. Since 2019, he has been the leader of the party's Saxony-Anhalt branch. He has been a member of the Landtag of Saxony-Anhalt since 1998, and a member of the Mansfeld-Südharz district council since 2007.

== Personal life ==
Gebhardt attended Polytechnic Secondary School, and from 1990 to 1992, the Markt Hettstedt high school. This was followed by a three-year course as a nurse at the Aschersleben district hospital, which he completed in 1996. He then worked as a nurse in the same hospital until 1998.

== Political career ==
Gebhardt joined the Party of Democratic Socialism (PDS) in 1991. He was spokesman for the Hettstedt branch of the party's youth association from 1994 to 2004, and was a member of the PDS district board of Mansfelder Land from 1994 to 1998. He served on the city council of Hettstedt from 1999 to 2005. Since 2007, Gebhardt has been a member of the Mansfeld-Südharz district council.

He was elected to the Landtag of Saxony-Anhalt on the PDS state list in the 1998 state election. He was re-elected in 2002. In May 2005, he resigned during the course of a public prosecutor's investigation. He was returned to the Landtag in the 2006 election, and was once again re-elected in 2011 and 2016.

Gebhardt is a member of the Committee on Federal and European Affairs and the Media, as well as the Committee on Education and Culture. He is also a member of the MDR Broadcasting Council and the ARD program advisory board.

On 29 June 2019, Gebhardt was elected as the state chairman of The Left, winning 69.5% of votes.
