= Julian Schwarze =

German politician (born 1983)

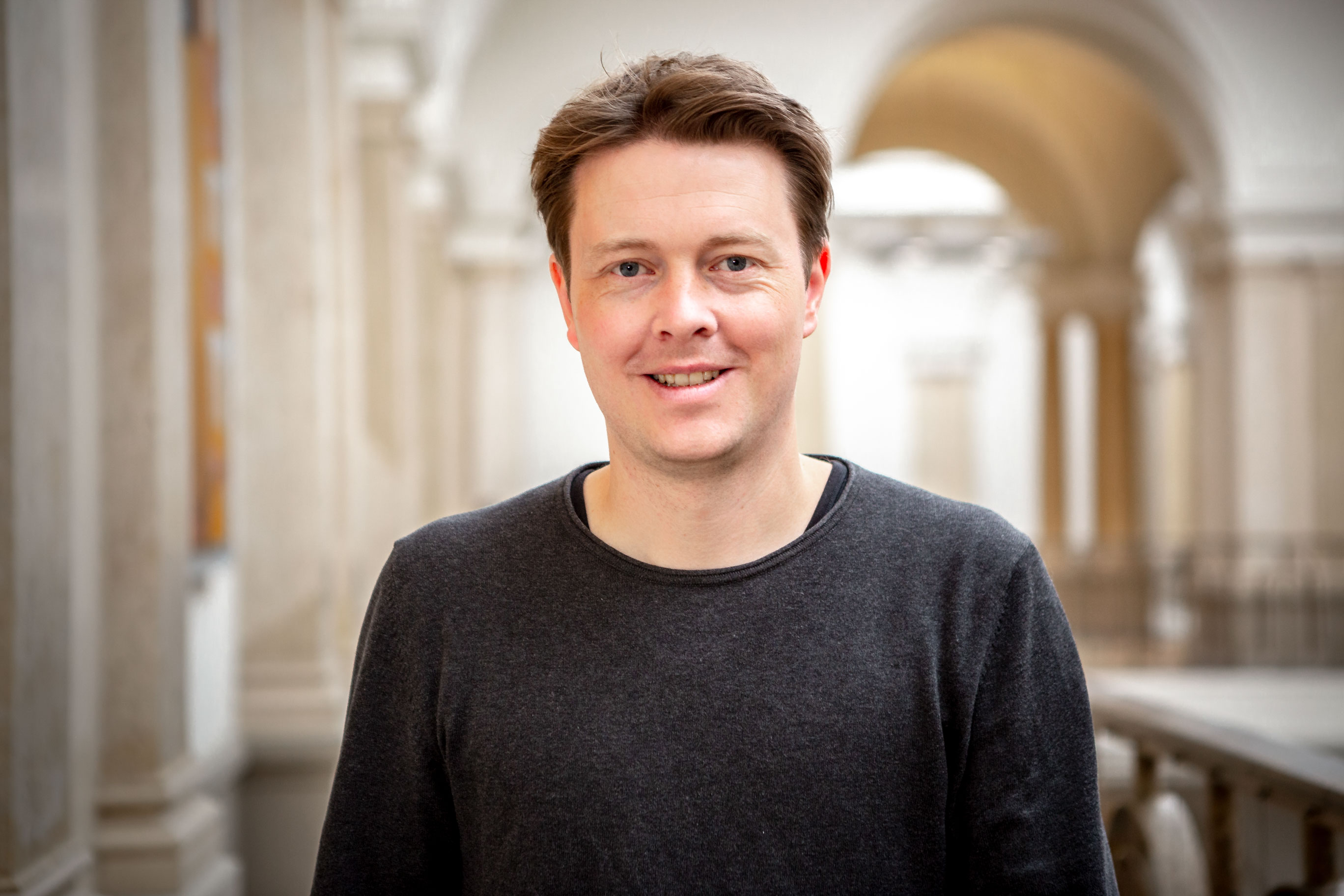
- Schwarze in 2021

Member of the Berlin House of Representatives
- Incumbent
- Assumed office 4 November 2021
- Preceded by: Marianne Burkert-Eulitz
- Constituency: Friedrichshain-Kreuzberg 6

Personal details
- Born: 1983 (age 42–43)
- Party: Alliance 90/The Greens

Julian Schwarze (born 1983) is a German politician serving as a member of the Berlin House of Representatives since 2021. From 2011 to 2021, he was a borough councillor of Friedrichshain-Kreuzberg.
