= Ministry of Finance (Saxony-Anhalt) =

Ministry of Finance of Saxony-Anhalt
- Ministerium der Finanzen des Landes Sachsen-Anhalt

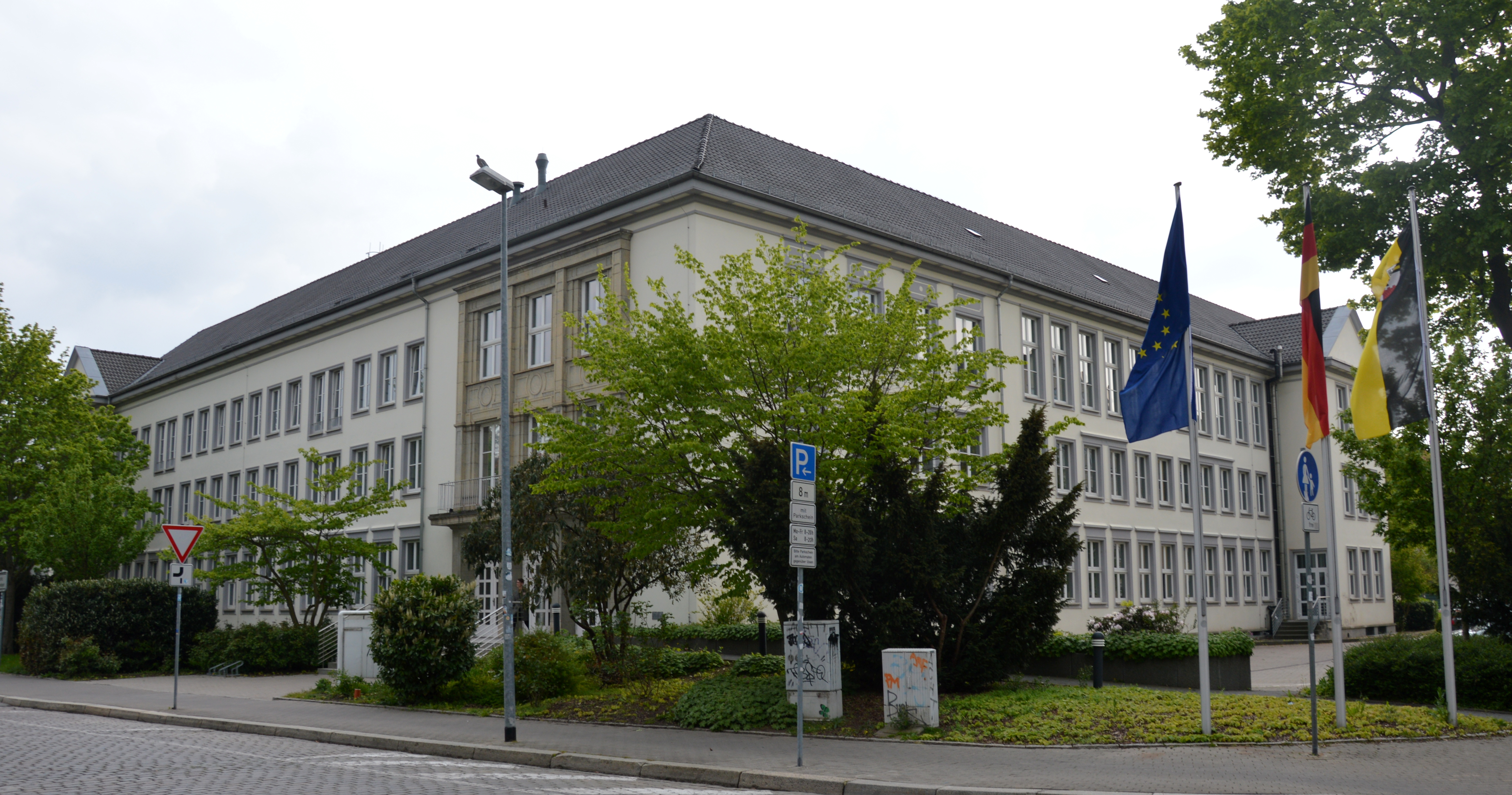
- Residence: Magdeburg
- Formation: 1990
- Website: mf.sachsen-anhalt.de/ministerium-der-finanzen/

The Ministry of Finance of Saxony-Anhalt (Ministerium der Finanzen des Landes Sachsen-Anhalt) is the finance ministry of the German state (Bundesland) Saxony-Anhalt. It was established in 1990 when the state was restored. The finance minister has been Michael Richter from 20 June 2019. Rüdiger Malter has been state secretary.

== History ==
After World War II, today's Saxony-Anhalt was part of the Provinzialverwaltung Sachsen, with finances governed initially by president Erhard Hübener. Saxony-Anhalt was restored as a state in 1990 after the German reunification, and the Ministry of Finance was reestablished.

The ministry governs and supervises the state's income and spending. It provides an annual budget plan. A double budget, planning for two years, was first written for 2005/06, then for 2008/09, 2010/11, 2012/13, 2015/16 and 2017/18. Additionally, financial planning for five years (Mittelfristige Finanzplanung) has been provided.

Taxes are the main source of income. In 2007, the ministry led by Jens Bullerjahn first succeeded to manage without new debts while old debts then amounted to 20 billion EUR. It was planned to begin to repay them beginning in 2009, but due to the 2008 financial crisis, it took until 2014 to begin repayment.

== Organisation ==
The ministry is organised in departments for general and legal affairs (Allgemeine Angelegenheiten, Dienst- und Tarifrecht), budget (Haushalt), estate and economics (Vermögens- und wirtschaftspolitische Angelegenheiten), management of properties and buildings (Staatliches Liegenschafts- und Baumanagement), and taxes (Steuern). It also contains an office for relations to the European Union (Interministerielle Geschäftsstelle zur Steuerung der EU-Strukturfonds).

The ministry runs 14 tax offices, an office for managing buildings and properties (Bau- und Liegenschaftsmanagement Sachsen-Anhalt), and, from 2022, an office for managing real estate and projects (Immobilien- und Projektmanagementgesellschaft Sachsen-Anhalt.
