= Kerstin Wolter =

German politician (born 1986)

- Wolter in 2025

Member of the Berlin House of Representatives
- Assuming office 29 October 2026
- Succeeding: Turgut Altuğ
- Constituency: Friedrichshain-Kreuzberg 3

Personal details
- Born: 1986 (age 39–40)
- Party: Die Linke

Kerstin Wolter-Ehling (born 1986) is a German politician who was elected member of the Berlin House of Representatives in 2026. She has served as co-chair of Die Linke in Berlin since 2025.
