= 2006 Saxony-Anhalt state election =

State election in Saxony-Anhalt, Germany

- 26 March 2006

All 97 seats in the Landtag of Saxony-Anhalt 49 seats needed for a majority
- Turnout: 902,251 (44.4%) ▼12.1%
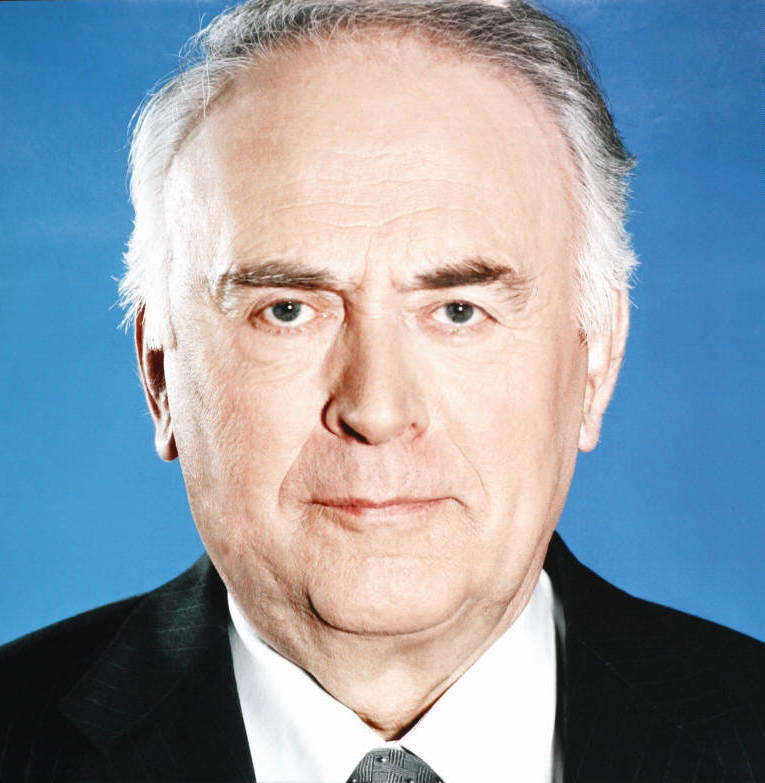

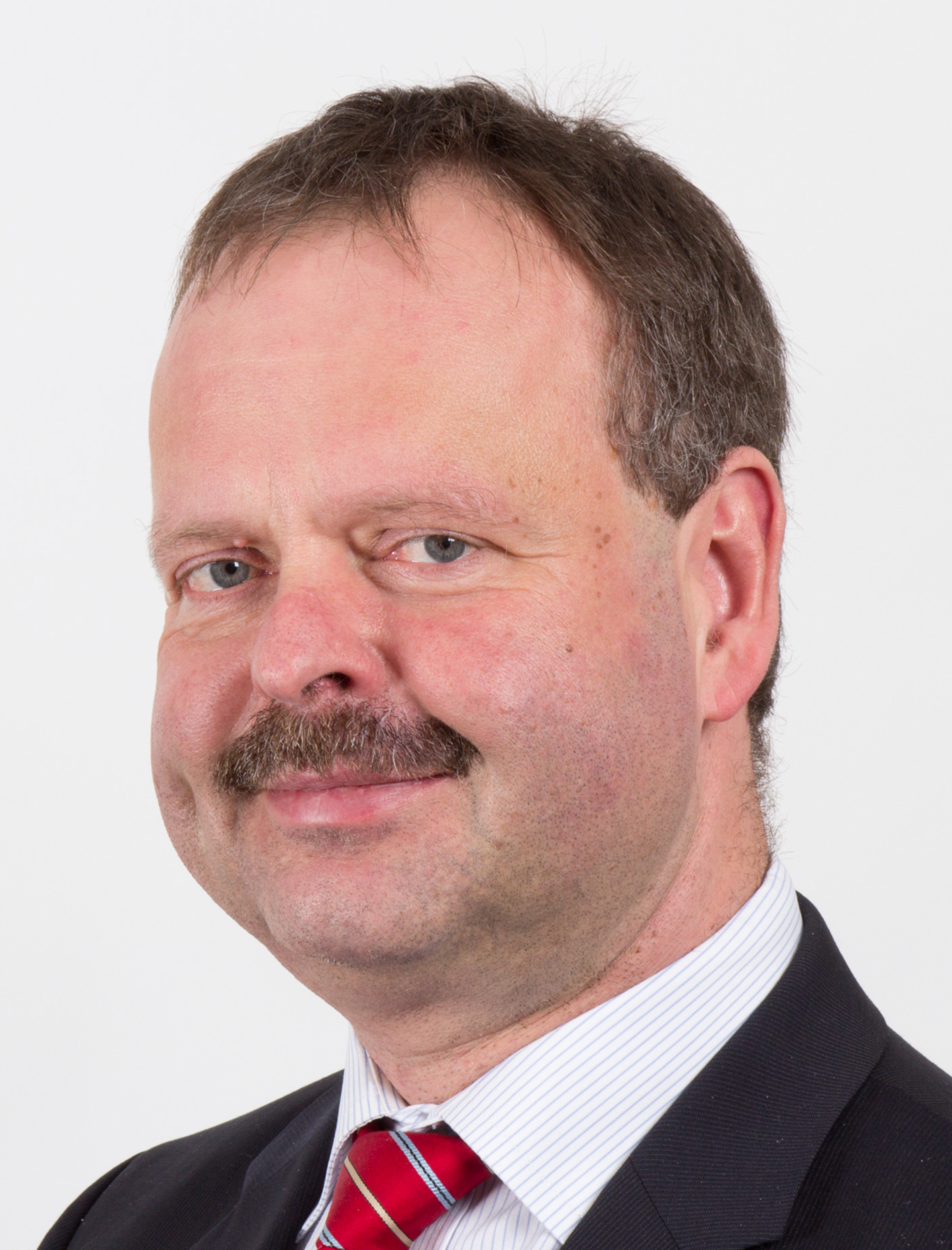

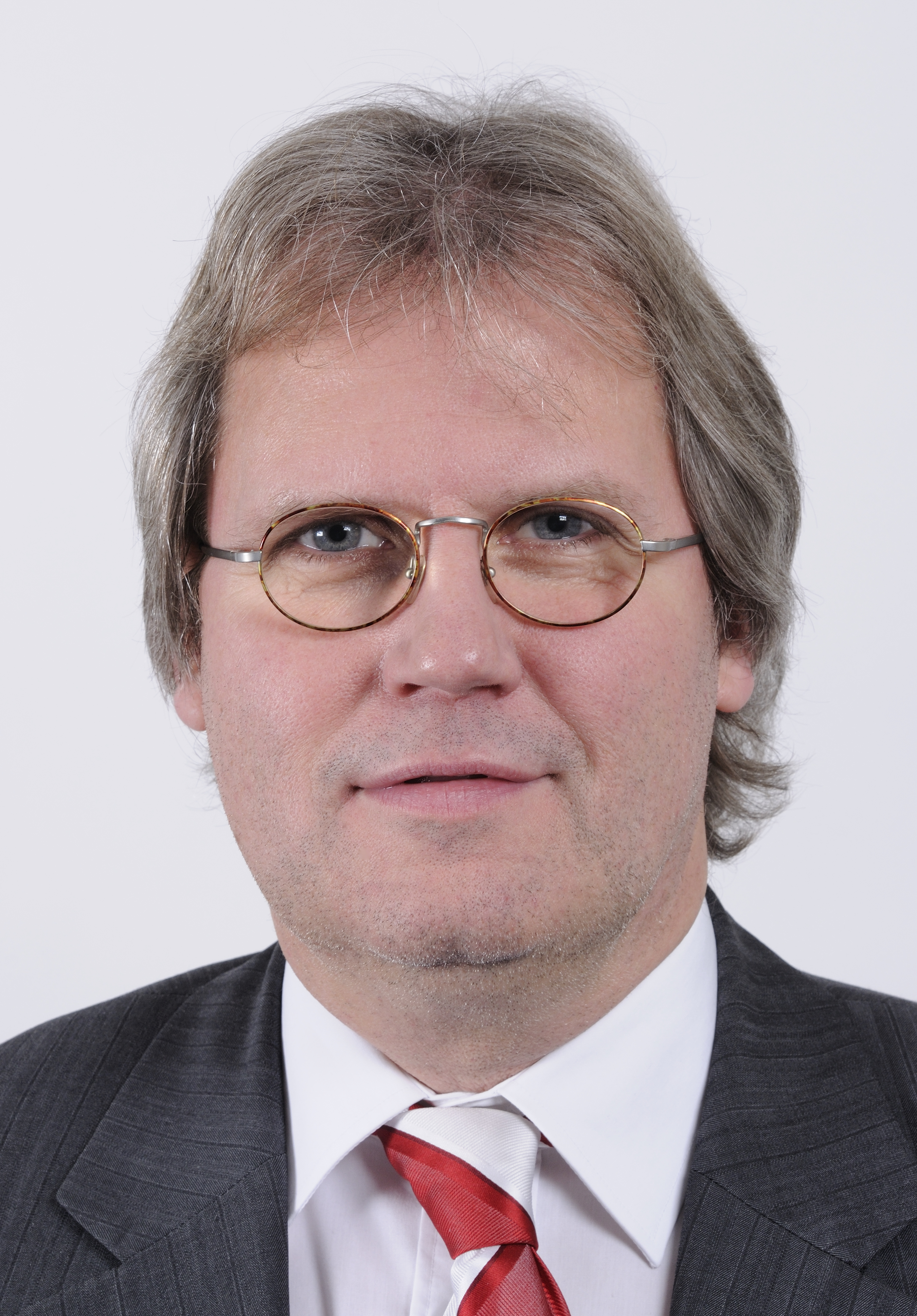

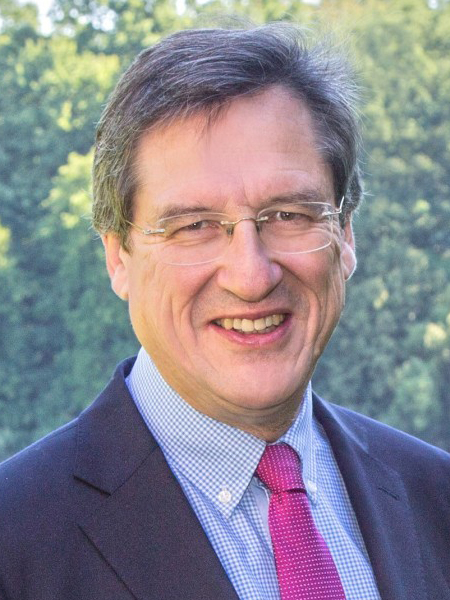
	First party	Second party
Leader	Wolfgang Böhmer	Wulf Gallert
Party	CDU	The Left.PDS
Last election	48 seats, 37.3%	25 seats, 20.4%
Seats won	40	26
Seat change	▼8	▲1
Popular vote	326,721	217,295
Percentage	36.2%	24.1%
Swing	▼1.1%	▲3.7%
	Third party	Fourth party
Leader	Jens Bullerjahn	Karl-Heinz Paque
Party	SPD	FDP
Last election	25 seats, 20.0%	17 seats, 13.3%
Seats won	24	7
Seat change	▼1	▼10
Popular vote	192,754	60,209
Percentage	21.4%	6.7%
Swing	▲1.4%	▼6.6%
- Results for the single-member constituencies
Minister-President before election
Wolfgang Böhmer
CDU
Elected Minister-President
Wolfgang Böhmer
CDU

The 2006 Saxony-Anhalt state election was held on 26 March 2006 to elect the members of the 5th Landtag of Saxony-Anhalt. The incumbent coalition government of the Christian Democratic Union (CDU) and Free Democratic Party (FDP) led by Minister-President Wolfgang Böhmer lost its majority. The CDU subsequently formed a coalition with the Social Democratic Party (SPD).

== Parties ==
The table below lists parties represented in the 4th Landtag of Saxony-Anhalt.

Name		Ideology	Leader(s)	2002 result	
Name		Ideology	Leader(s)	Votes (%)	Seats
CDU	Christian Democratic Union of Germany; Christlich Demokratische Union Deutschlands	Christian democracy	Wolfgang Böhmer	37.3%	48 / 115
Linke	The Left.PDS; Die Linke.PDS	Democratic socialism	Wulf Gallert	20.4%	25 / 115
SPD	Social Democratic Party of Germany; Sozialdemokratische Partei Deutschlands	Social democracy	Jens Bullerjahn	20.0%	25 / 115
FDP	Free Democratic Party; Freie Demokratische Partei	Classical liberalism	Karl-Heinz Paque	13.3%	17 / 115

== Opinion polling ==
Polling firm	Fieldwork date	Sample size	CDU	Linke	SPD	FDP	Grüne	Others	Lead
2006 state election	26 Mar 2006	–	36.2	24.1	21.4	6.7	3.6	8.1	12.1
Emnid	7–18 Mar 2006	500	36	22	25	6	4	7	11
Forschungsgruppe Wahlen	13–16 Mar 2006	~1,000	37	23	23	6	4	7	14
Infratest dimap	13–15 Mar 2006	1,000	36	23	26	6	4	5	10
IfM Leipzig	10–13 Mar 2006	1,003	38	23	25	6	3	5	13
Infratest dimap	27 Feb–1 Mar 2006	1,000	36	22	27	6	4	5	9
IWD	25–30 Jan 2006	750	38.1	19.2	26.9	6.4	3.4	6.0	11.2
Infratest dimap	30 Jan–1 Feb 2006	1,000	33	23	29	6	3	6	4
Infratest dimap	9–13 Dec 2005	1,000	31	27	30	6	2	4	1
dimap	25 Nov 2005	2,500	33	25	25	9	4	4	8
IWD	9–15 Aug 2005	750	26.6	30	28.1	6	3.3	6.0	1.9
IWD	8–18 Apr 2005	750	37	21	26	5	4	7	11
dimap	18 Apr 2005	1,008	47	18	23	5	3	4	24
Infratest dimap	14–19 Jan 2005	1,000	37	30	28	6	4	5	9
IWD	October 2004	754	23.8	25.1	26.2	7.0	7.0	10.9	4.8
IWD	April 2004	750	33.4	23.0	28.6	7.0	6.6	1.4	4.8
IfM Leipzig	1–2 Mar 2004	1,009	48	19	21	4	6	2	27
IWD	13–14 Oct 2003	750	43.2	13.9	21.1	6.8	3.4	11.2	22.1
IWD	1–9 Apr 2003	750	46.2	9.0	27.9	3.8	4.8	8.3	18.3
IWD	6 Nov 2002	?	31.0	14.8	39.2	7.8	4.6	2.6	8.2
2002 state election	21 Apr 2002	–	37.3	20.4	20.0	13.3	2.0	7.1	16.9

== Election result ==
Summary of the 26 March 2006 election results for the Landtag of Saxony-Anhalt
Party	Votes	%	+/-	Seats	+/-	Seats %
Christian Democratic Union (CDU)	326,721	36.2	▼1.1	40	▼8	41.2
The Left.PDS (Linke)	217,295	24.1	▲3.7	26	▲1	26.8
Social Democratic Party (SPD)	192,754	21.4	▲1.4	24	▼1	24.7
Free Democratic Party (FDP)	60,209	6.7	▼6.6	7	▼10	7.2
Alliance 90/The Greens (Grüne)	32,117	3.6	▲1.6	0	±0	0
German People's Union (DVU)	26,905	3.0	▲3.0	0	±0	0
Parent Party (Eltern)	14,499	1.6	▲1.6	0	±0	0
Others	31,754	3.5		0	±0	0
Total	902,254	100.0		97	▼18	
Voter turnout		44.4	▼12.1			

Popular Vote
CDU	36.21%
DIE LINKE.PDS	24.08%
SPD	21.36%
FDP	6.67%
GRÜNE	3.56%
DVU	2.98%
Other	5.13%

Landtag seats
CDU	41.24%
DIE LINKE.PDS	26.80%
SPD	24.74%
FDP	7.22%

== Sources ==
- Saxony-Anhalt State Statistics Office
