= Friedrichshain-Kreuzberg 3 =

State electoral district of Germany

- Electoral district for the Berlin House of Representatives
- Friedrichshain-Kreuzberg 3 in 2026
- District: Friedrichshain-Kreuzberg
- Electorate: 34,765 (2026)

Current electoral district
- Party: The Left
- Member: Kerstin Wolter-Ehling

Friedrichshain-Kreuzberg 3 is an electoral constituency (German: Wahlkreis) represented in the House of Representatives of Berlin. It elects one member via first-past-the-post voting.

== Geography ==
The constituency comprises the areas of Mehringplatz East Lindenstr./Axel-Springer- Str., Moritzplatz, Oranienplatz, Lausitzer Platz, Urbanstraße, East Zossener Str. within the borough of Friedrichshain-Kreuzberg.

There were 34,765 eligible voters in 2026.

== Members ==
Election	Member	Party	%
1995	Riza Baran	Green	35.3
1999	Özcan Mutlu	Green	30.7
2001	Stefan Zackenfels	SPD	31.3
2006	Özcan Mutlu	Green	33.8
2011	Turgut Altuğ	Green	36.9
2016	Turgut Altuğ	Green	31.3
2021	Turgut Altuğ	Green	35.0
2023	Turgut Altuğ	Green	35.0
2026	Kerstin Wolter-Ehling	Left	42.2

== Election results ==
=== 2026 election ===
State election (2026): Friedrichshain-Kreuzberg 3
Notes:	Blue background denotes the winner of the electorate vote. Pink background denotes a candidate elected from their party list. Yellow background denotes an electorate win by a list member, or other incumbent. A ✓ or ✗ denotes status of any incumbent, win or lose respectively.						
Party	Candidate	Votes	%	±%	Party votes	%	±%
Left	Kerstin Wolter-Ehling	11,511	42.2	▲19.0	12,898	47.0	▲25.1
Greens	Enad Altaweel	7,665	28.1	▼9.7	5,964	21.7	▼14.7
SPD	Sven Heinemann	2,265	8.3	▼5.4	2,396	8.7	▼4.0
CDU	Max Kindler	2,246	8.2	▼4.3	2,309	8.4	▼3.4
AfD	Christof Meuren	1,223	4.5	▲1.8	1,274	4.6	▲2.0
BSW	Mertcan Yıldız	719	2.6		858	3.1	
Volt	Anke Köhler	680	2.5		679	2.5	▲1.1
PARTEI	Annett Duden Glatzer	386	1.4	▼2.2	252	0.9	▼1.7
FDP	Johannes Dallheimer	353	1.3	▼1.7	379	1.4	▼1.9
Tierschutzpartei					261	1.0	▼0.8
Independent	Florian Fleischmann	126	0.5				
MERA25	Mareike Strelitz	77	0.3				
PdF					64	0.2	
Independent	Mutombo Kandu Mansamba	51	0.2				
DKP					40	0.1	▼0.1
du.					23	0.1	▼0.4
Bergpartei, die ÜberPartei					21	0.1	▼0.2
ÖDP					18	0.1	▼0.1
SGP					8	0.0	▼0.1
Informal votes		296			154		
Total valid votes		27,302			27,444		
Turnout		27,598	79.4	▲12.0			
Left gain from Greens	Majority	3,846	14.1				

=== 2023 repeat election ===
Changes denoted below for the 2023 election are compared to the 2016 election, as the 2021 election was declared invalid.

State election (2023): Friedrichshain-Kreuzberg 3
Notes:	Blue background denotes the winner of the electorate vote. Pink background denotes a candidate elected from their party list. Yellow background denotes an electorate win by a list member, or other incumbent. A ✓ or ✗ denotes status of any incumbent, win or lose respectively.						
Party	Candidate	Votes	%	±%	Party votes	%	±%
Greens	✓ Turgut Altuğ	5,634	35.1	▲1.7	5,294	32.9	▲4.0
Left	Ali Reza Amiri	3,185	19.8	▲2.1	3,472	21.6	Steady
SPD	Sevim Aydin	2,879	17.9	▼3.2	2,539	15.8	▼4.4
CDU	Kurt Wansner	2,381	14.8	▲6.7	2,310	14.4	▲6.2
PARTEI	Alexander Franz Merkel	544	3.4	▼0.7	375	2.3	▼1.6
AfD	Gerhard Zaucker	447	2.8	▼2.9	463	2.9	▼2.9
Tierschutzpartei	Romana Angelika Foster	357	2.2		258	1.6	▼0.1
FDP	Jörg Höhn	356	2.2	▼0.8	383	2.4	▼1.2
Team Todenhöfer					203	1.3	
Volt					173	1.1	
Klimaliste					113	0.7	
dieBasis	Joachim Schäfer	146	0.9		100	0.6	
du.	Nicole Drakos	143	0.9		80	0.5	
Pirates					50	0.3	▼2.5
Mieterpartei					50	0.3	
DKP					41	0.3	▼0.2
Gray Panthers					35	0.2	▼0.2
Bergpartei, die ÜberPartei					29	0.2	▼0.3
Humanists					24	0.1	
The Grays					19	0.1	
FW					18	0.1	
SGP					18	0.1	▼0.1
Verjüngungsforschung					14	0.1	▼0.3
ÖDP					14	0.1	▼0.3
The Pinks/Alliance 21					8	0.0	
Bildet Berlin!					7	0.0	
NPD					2	0.0	▼0.2
LKR					1	0.0	▼0.3
BüSo					0	0.0	Steady
Informal votes		141			113		
Total valid votes		16,072			16,093		
Turnout		16,226	57.6	▼9.7			
Greens hold	Majority	2,449	15.3				

=== 2021 election (annulled) ===
The election in 2021 was annulled and rerun in 2023.

State election (2021): Friedrichshain-Kreuzberg 3
Notes:	Blue background denotes the winner of the electorate vote. Pink background denotes a candidate elected from their party list. Yellow background denotes an electorate win by a list member, or other incumbent. A ✓ or ✗ denotes status of any incumbent, win or lose respectively.						
Party	Candidate	Votes	%	±%	Party votes	%	±%
Greens	✓ Turgut Altuğ	7,010	35.0	▲1.7	6,210	30.9	▲2.0
Left	Ali Reza Amiri	4,072	20.4	▲2.6	4,567	22.7	▲1.2
SPD	Sevim Aydin	4,025	20.1	▼1.0	3,525	17.5	▼2.6
CDU	Kurt Wansner	1,700	8.5	▲0.4	1,543	7.7	▼0.5
FDP	Jörg Höhn	765	3.8	▲0.8	729	3.6	Steady
Team Todenhöfer					721	3.6	
PARTEI	Alexander Franz Merkel	760	3.8	▼0.3	559	2.8	▼1.2
AfD	Gerhard Zaucker	543	2.7	▼3.0	535	2.7	▼3.1
Tierschutzpartei	Romana Angelika Foster	525	2.6		296	1.5	▼0.2
dieBasis	Joachim Schäfer	421	2.1		308	1.5	
Volt					252	1.3	
Klimaliste					203	1.0	
du.	Nicole Drakos	185	0.9		97	0.5	
Pirates					90	0.4	▼2.4
FW					75	0.4	
APT					54	0.3	
Bergpartei, die ÜberPartei					46	0.2	▼0.2
DKP					41	0.2	▼0.3
Mieterpartei					41	0.2	
Gray Panthers					38	0.2	▼0.2
Humanists					37	0.2	
The Grays					30	0.1	
ÖDP					22	0.1	▼0.2
Verjüngungsforschung					22	0.1	▼0.3
Bildet Berlin!					11	0.1	
LKR					8	0.0	▼0.2
SGP					8	0.0	▼0.1
NPD					7	0.0	▼0.2
The Pinks/Alliance 21					6	0.0	
BüSo					5	0.0	Steady
Informal votes		257			193		
Total valid votes		20,006			20,086		
Turnout		20,305	72.1	▲4.7			
Greens hold	Majority	2,938	14.6				

== See also ==
- Politics of Berlin
- House of Representatives of Berlin
