= Karl-Heinz Paque =

German politician (born 1956)

Karl-Heinz Paque MdL a. D. Landesminister a. D.
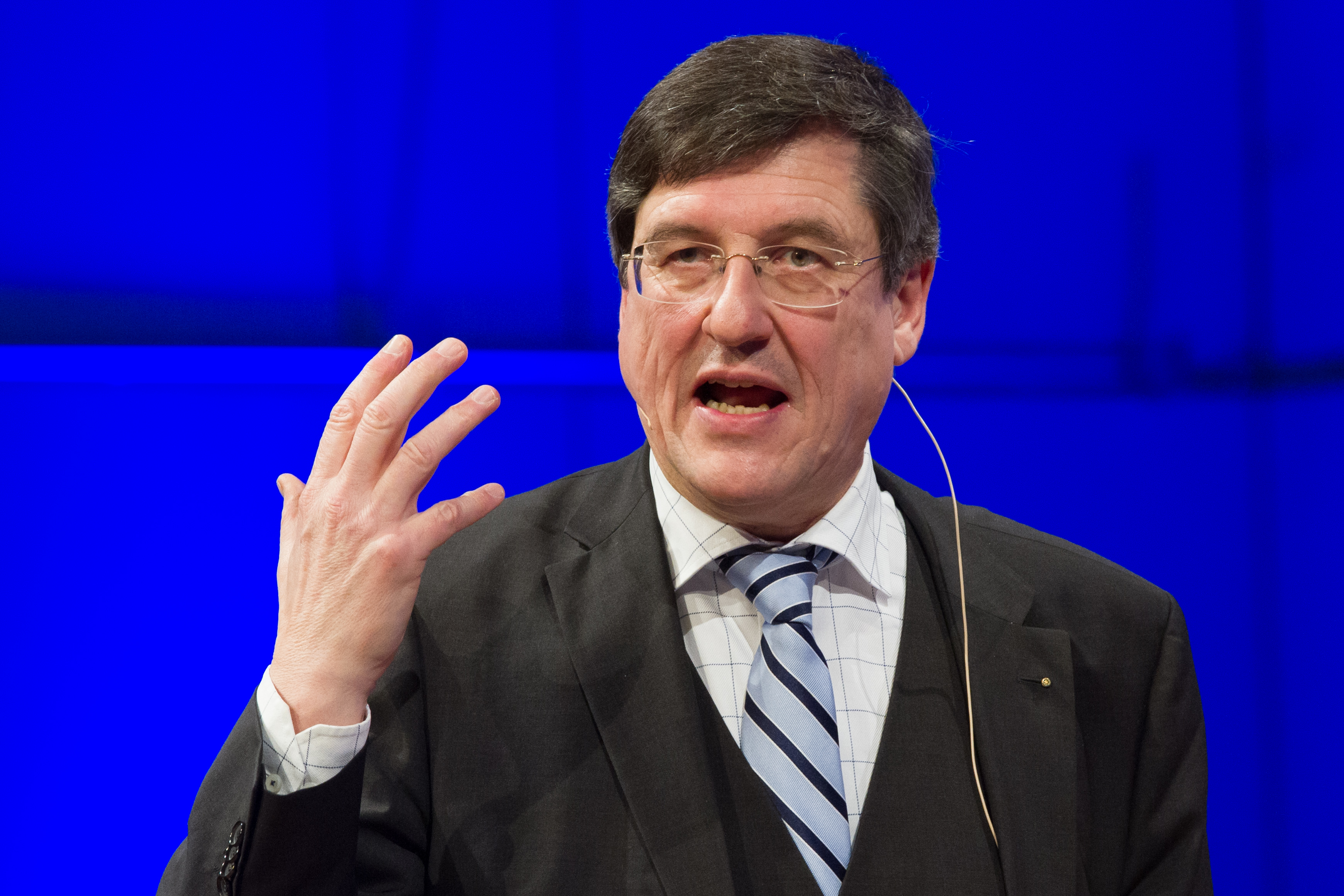

Chairman of the Friedrich Naumann Foundation
- Incumbent
- Assumed office 26 September 2018
- Preceded by: Wolfgang Gerhardt

Leader of the Free Democratic Party in the Landtag of Saxony-Anhalt
- In office 24 April 2006 – 31 March 2008
- Chief Whip: Lydia Hüskens
- Deputy: Lutz Franke
- Preceded by: Veit Wolpert
- Succeeded by: Veit Wolpert

Minister of Finances of Saxony-Anhalt
- In office 17 May 2002 – 24 April 2006
- Minister-President: Wolfgang Böhmer
- Preceded by: Wolfgang Gerhards
- Succeeded by: Jens Bullerjahn

Member of the Landtag of Saxony-Anhalt
- In office 16 May 2002 – 31 March 2008
- Succeeded by: Uwe Schrader
- Constituency: FDP List

Personal details
- Born: Karl-Heinz Paqué; October 4, 1956 (age 70) Saarbrücken, West Germany
- Party: Free Democratic Party
- Spouse: Sabine Paqué
- Education: Saarland University; University of Kiel; University of British Columbia
- Website: https://www.freiheit.org/de/karl-heinz-paque

Karl-Heinz Paqué (born 4 October 1956) is a German economist and politician of the liberal Free Democratic Party (FDP) who has been serving as head of the Friedrich Naumann Foundation since 2018. He was Minister of Finance in the state of Saxony-Anhalt from 2002 to 2006.

== Early life and education ==
Paqué was born in the West German city of Saarbrücken and studied economics and received his PhD in 1980.

== Political career ==
Paqué entered the FDP in 1999 and was State Minister of Finance in the government of Minister-President Wolfgang Böhmer of Saxony-Anhalt from 2002 to 2006.

== Other activities ==
- Cologne Institute for Economic Research (IW Köln), Member of the Research Advisory Board
- Halle Institute for Economic Research (IWH), Member of the Supervisory Board
- Agenda Austria, Chair of the Advisory Board (2013–2019)
