= Cornelia Lüddemann =

German politician

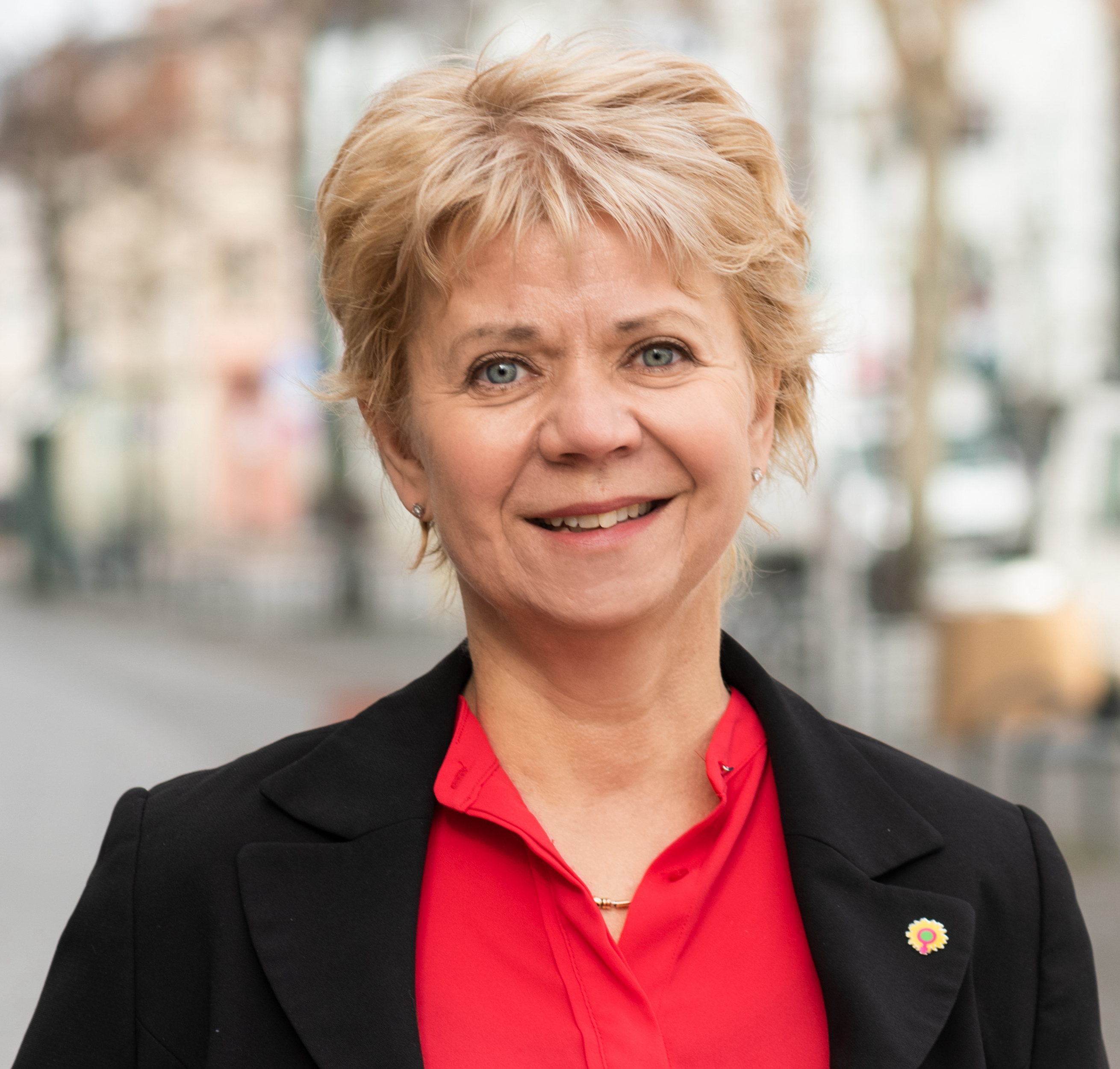
- Lüddemann in 2021

Leader of Alliance 90/The Greens in the Landtag of Saxony-Anhalt
- Incumbent
- Assumed office April 2016
- Preceded by: Claudia Dalbert

Leader of Alliance 90/The Greens in Saxony-Anhalt
- In office 2011–2016

Member of the Landtag of Saxony-Anhalt
- Incumbent
- Assumed office 19 April 2011
- Constituency: Party list

Member of the Dessau-Roßlau City Council
- In office 25 May 2014 – 2015

Personal details
- Born: Cornelia Lüddemann; 11 May 1968 (age 57) Dessau, East Germany
- Party: Alliance 90/The Greens

Cornelia Lüddemann (born 11 May 1968) is a German politician of Alliance 90/The Greens. Since 2016, she has served as chairwoman of the Greens parliamentary group in the Landtag of Saxony-Anhalt. She previously served as leader of the party's state branch from 2011 to 2016. She was the Greens lead candidate for the 2021 Saxony-Anhalt state election.

== Personal life ==
Lüddemann grew up in a Catholic family in East Germany. After graduating from high school in 1986, Lüddemann completed an apprenticeship as a library worker and worked in this profession until 1991. From 1994 to 2001 she headed the constituency office of the Bundestag deputy Steffi Lemke. As a part-time job, she completed a degree in educational science with a focus on social work at the University of Halle-Wittenberg, which she graduated in 1997 as a qualified pedagogue. From 2001 to 2010 she worked as managing director for the State Women's Council of Saxony-Anhalt. Afterwards, she became managing director of the Federal Association of Sociocultural Centres in Berlin.

== Political career ==
Lüddemann became involved with the New Forum in 1989. She joined the Alliance 90/The Greens in 1993, and became a member of the state from 1997 to 2001. Ahead of the 2011 state election, she held third place on the Greens state list, and was elected to the Landtag. From July 2014 to the beginning of 2015, she was a member of the Dessau-Roßlau city council. From 2011 to 2016, she was state chairwoman of the Greens in Saxony-Anhalt.

After Claudia Dalbert became a minister in the state government in April 2016, Lüddemann replaced her as Greens parliamentary leader. She then stepped down as state chairwoman.

In September 2020, she was elected as the Greens' lead candidate for the 2021 state election.
