= Sven Heinemann =

German politician (born 1978)

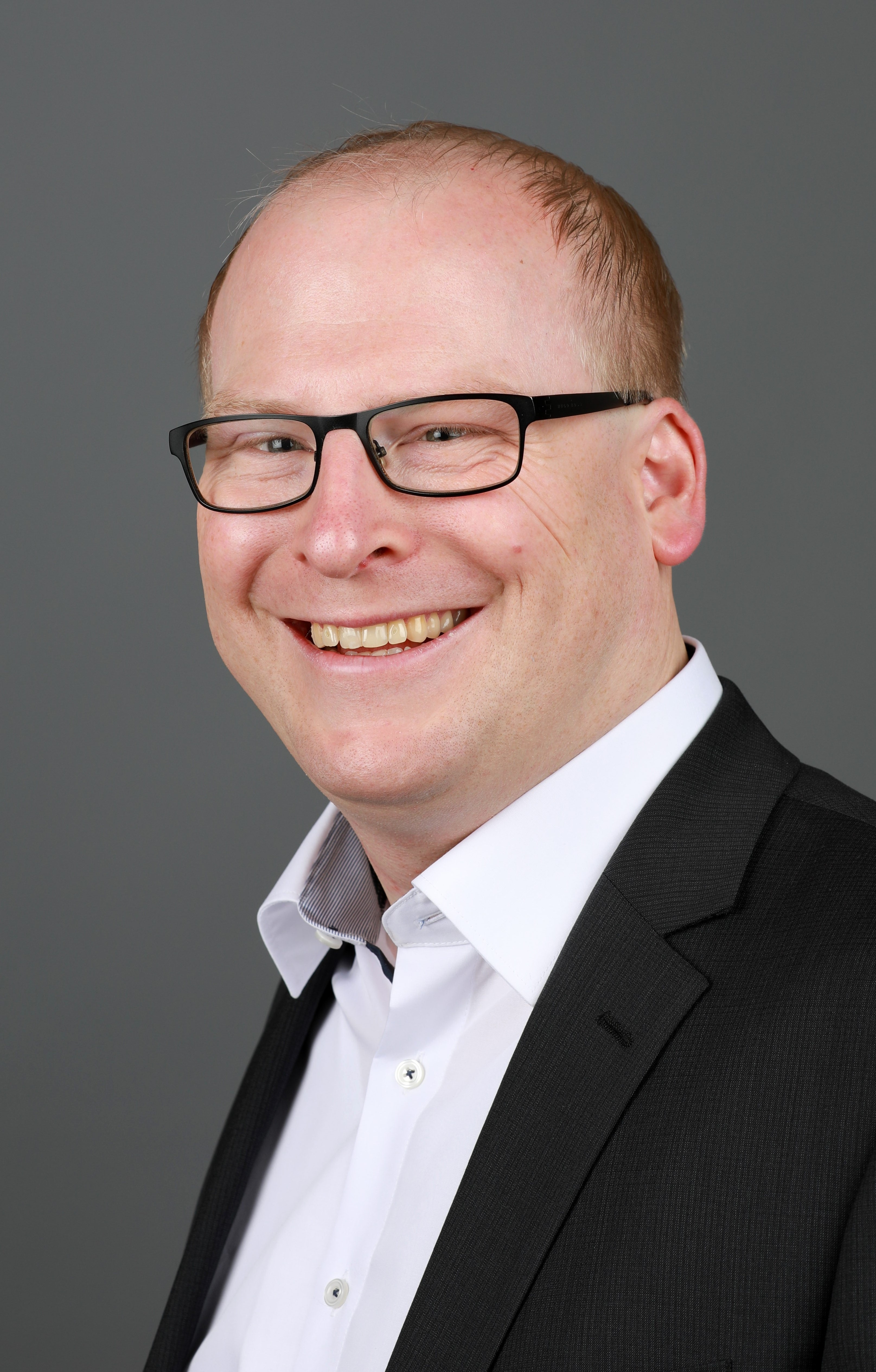
- Heinemann in 2017

Member of the Abgeordnetenhaus of Berlin
- Incumbent
- Assumed office 27 October 2011

Personal details
- Born: 26 October 1978 (age 47) Baden-Baden
- Party: Social Democratic Party (since 2001)

Sven Heinemann (born 26 October 1978 in Baden-Baden) is a German politician serving as a member of the Abgeordnetenhaus of Berlin since 2011. He has served as managing director of the Social Democratic Party in Berlin since 2022.
