= Thomas Lippmann =

German politician

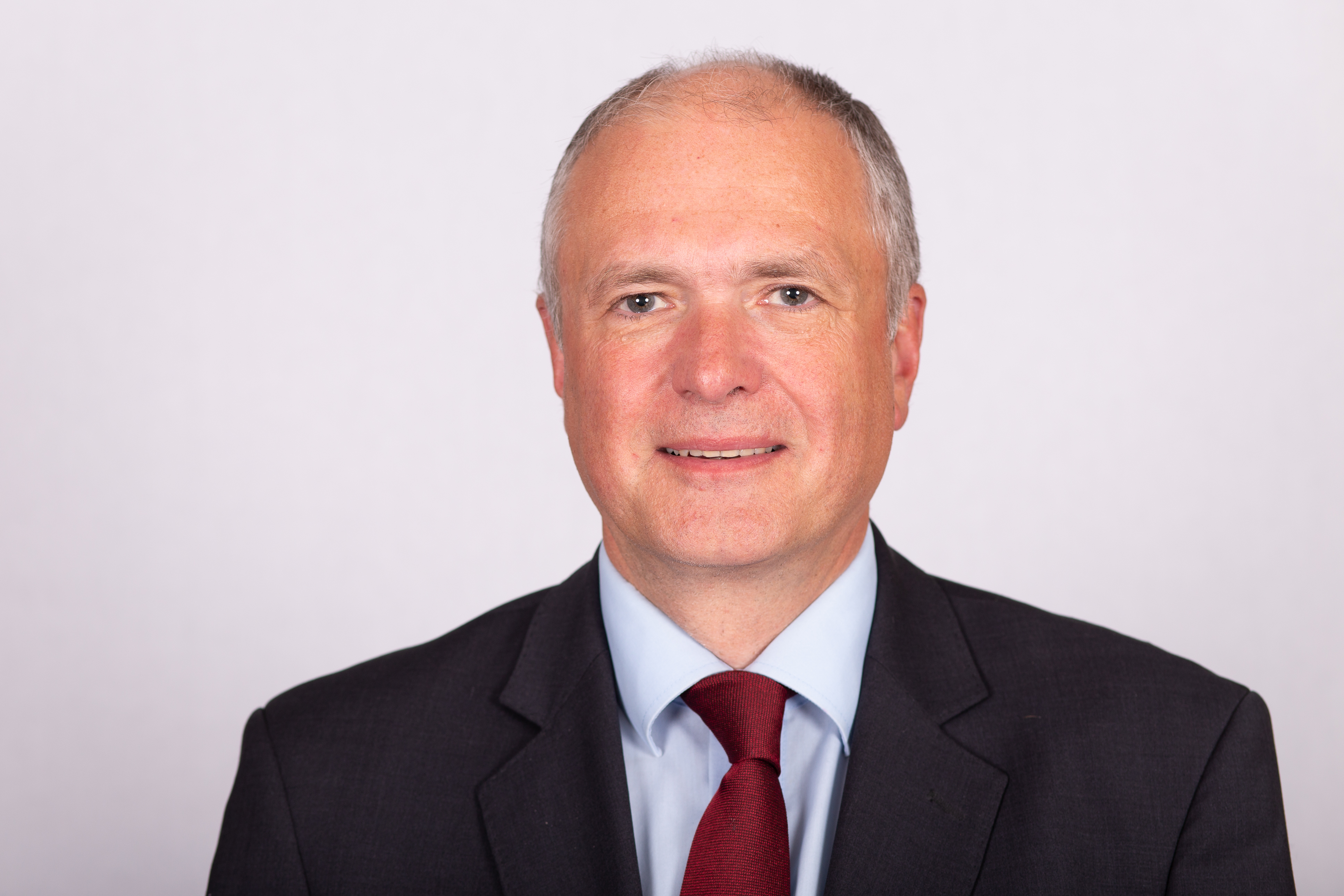
Lippmann in 2018.

Thomas Lippmann (born 30 December 1961) is a German politician from Die Linke.

== Political career ==
He was elected to the Landtag of Saxony-Anhalt in the 2016 state election.

He was leader of the parliamentary group from 2017 to 2021.
