= Klimaliste =

Microparties and voter groups in Germany

Klimaliste (English: Climate List) is the name of various microparties and voter groups in Germany that advocate climate protection measures to meet the 1.5 °C IPCC and Paris Agreement warming limit target. They see themselves as a grassroots movement.

Since 2020, climate activists have won mandates in German local elections. They received national and international attention by participating in the state elections in Baden-Württemberg and Rhineland-Palatinate in March 2021. A federal party was founded a quarter of a year later.

== Overview ==
=== Germany ===
In October 2020, the registered association Klimaliste Deutschland was founded. This differentiates itself from the federal party of the same name, which was founded on 19 June 2021 in order to be able to participate in federal and European elections in the future.

Among other things, it demands a CO_{2} tax of 195 euros per tonne and social compensation via "climate money" paid out to everyone. Furthermore, Germany should be CO_{2}-neutral as soon as possible, but no later than 2031. According to the party's founding programme, this should happen, among other things, through a five- to seven-fold faster expansion of wind power and photovoltaics, a heat turnaround and a transport turnaround.

The federal Klimaliste political party participated in the 2024 European Parliament election and had a membership of 234 as of the same year.

=== Baden-Württemberg ===
The Klimaliste Baden-Württemberg (KlimalisteBW) was founded in September 2020 in Freiburg as the first Klimaliste with party status to run for the state parliamentary elections on 14 March 2021. The political goal of the Klimaliste is to implement the Paris climate goals in a science-based and socially just way. In mid-January 2021, two of the six board members resigned and renounced their state parliament candidacies. Two others announced their resignation for the party congress in February, but continued to run. The KlimalisteBW contested 67 of the 70 constituencies and achieved 0.9%. It is eligible to run in the 2021 federal election, but only ran direct candidates. The party received a total of 3.967 of the primary votes (0.0%). In a ballot in December 2021, members decided to dissolve the party on 31 December 2021. Previous members were to join Klimaliste Deutschland to form a regional association.

=== Bavaria ===
- Erlangen: The Klimaliste Erlangen was founded in July 2019 and is the movement's namesake. The Klimaliste's stated goal is the implementation of a consistent climate policy at the municipal level. In the municipal elections on 15 March 2020, it received 3.9% of the vote or two seats in the Erlangen city council. For the 2021 federal election, a direct candidate was nominated in the Erlangen federal constituency.
- Kempten: The voters' association FutureforKempten (FFK) also formed in July 2019. In the city council election on 15 March 2020, it received 5.1% of the votes cast, giving it two seats. Dominik Tartler is the youngest city councillor in the city's history to hold the post of youth commissioner.

=== Berlin ===
The Klimaliste Berlin (originally radikal:klima) emerged in 2020 from the popular initiative "Klimanotstand Berlin". In November, a deputy pirate in the Mitte district switched to the new party. The Klimaliste Berlin achieved 0.4% of the secondary votes in the 2021 election for the Berlin House of Representatives. It put up candidates for eight of the twelve district councils and currently has 120 members (as of 30 July 2021).

Its core demand is consistent compliance with the 1.5 degree target. As a result, the city should be emission-free ("climate positive") by 2030 at the latest. The Klimaliste Berlin does not see itself as a single-issue party, because the climate issue extends to many areas. The general vision is based on the concepts of climate justice and the donut economy. In addition to the election programme, there is a 300-page "climate plan".

=== Hesse ===
In October 2020, the association Klimaliste Hessen e.V. was founded in Bad Vilbel. In the local elections in Hesse in 2021, it achieved eleven mandates in six local councils. In Marburg, the best result to date was achieved with 6.4%. For the 2021 federal election, direct candidacies are being supported in two Hessian constituencies.

=== Lower Saxony ===
In Lower Saxony, climate activists independent of each other stood for the local elections in September:

- Göttingen: Klimaliste Göttingen e.V. (KLG) received 0.8% and no seat in the city council elections.
- Hanover: Klimabündnis Hannover - Unabhängige Wähler*innengemeinschaft received 0.7% and no seat.
- District of Rotenburg (Wümme): The Citizens' List "Climate, Health, Social Affairs" stood for the district council (without winning a mandate), as well as in the municipalities of Bothel (1), Hemslingen (1) and Scheeßel (0).

=== Rhineland-Palatinate ===
In June 2020, the association Klimaliste RLP e. V. was founded. The voters' association contested the state parliamentary election on 14 March 2021 and achieved 0.7%. In February 2021, Klimaliste RLP had 150 members. For the 2021 federal election, individual candidates supported by Klimaliste RLP are running as direct candidates in 11 of the 15 constituencies in Rhineland-Palatinate.

=== Saxony ===
At the beginning of 2021, the association Klimaliste Sachsen e.V. was founded.

=== Saxony-Anhalt ===
The Klimaliste Sachsen-Anhalt (Climate List ST) was founded in February 2021. It was the youngest party to run in the state parliamentary elections on 6 June. In addition to typical climate protection demands, there are also democracy-theoretical ones, such as lowering the voting age to 14 and the introduction of a substitute vote. It received 0.1% of the second votes.

=== Schleswig-Holstein ===
The association, founded in April 2021, aspires to party status.

== History ==
The first Klimalisten formed in July 2019 in two Bavarian cities, in Erlangen for the first time under the name Klimaliste. They won two seats each in March 2020.

This was followed by the equally successful local elections in North Rhine-Westphalia. Some actors had already been active in local politics before.

In June 2020, the first state-level climate list was formed in Rhineland-Palatinate. In September 2020, the Klimaliste Baden-Württemberg, the first climate list to give itself the status of a party, was founded in order to be able to run in state elections. Through these two state elections in March 2021, the movement achieved nationwide to international attention for the first time. In parallel, the Klimaliste Hessen, the first association for local elections at the state level, was formed. The Klimaliste Hessen was the first party for local elections in Germany.

The Berlin party radikal:klima, which had already been active since 2020, renamed itself Klimaliste Berlin in April 2021.

In June, Klimaliste Saxony-Anhalt contested the state elections and the federal party Klimaliste Germany was founded.

For the elections in September 2021, it is planned to run direct candidates for the 2021 federal election. On the same day, Klimaliste Berlin will stand for election. In addition, various Klimalisten are running in the local elections in Lower Saxony. At the end of 2021, the first Klimalist party in Baden-Württemberg dissolved again to form a state association as part of the federal party.

In 2024 the nationwide party Klimaliste Deutschland started a cooperation with Tierschutzpartei, which subsequently renamed from "Partei Mensch Umwelt Tierschutz" to "Partei Mensch Klima Tierschutz" in February 2026 as a step towards the fusion of both parties, that is planned to be finalized in summer 2026.

== Relationship to other political groups ==
=== Alliance 90/The Greens ===
Climate activists criticise Bündnis 90/Die Grünen for not being climate-consistent enough, especially in terms of the 1.5 degree target. Thus, climate activists are often perceived as competitors to the established party.

In general, the top candidate for Rhineland-Palatinate saw "no programmatic and content expertise" for the "vision of a sustainable future." It was not enough just to be "better than the others." The Green top candidate was confronted with this criticism in the summer interview and rejected it.

One example of concrete dissatisfaction is the continued construction of the A 49 motorway through Dannenröder Forst despite Green government participation in Hesse.

Six months before the state elections in Baden-Württemberg in 2021, Minister President Kretschmann was quoted as saying that the KlimalisteBW's election candidacy could have "grave consequences", "for example, that it would not be enough for a government because it would fragment." The inclusion of the 1.5-degree target in the election programmes of the Greens and other state parties was seen as a success for the young party. As a result, the election campaign was renegotiated within the KlimalisteBW. On the very evening of the election, a public debate began about the extent to which this would have prevented a Green-Red coalition.

Annalena Baerbock and Cornelia Lüddemann independently expressed themselves thus: on the one hand, the climate issue would be brought more into focus by the Klimalisten. On the other hand, both refer to democratic processes. Furthermore, Lüddemann could understand that the Alliance Greens "no longer seem so straight."

In the taz, it was discussed that the election campaign of the Klimaliste Berlin could weaken the Greens. This was compared with the presidential election in the United States in 2000 in which Ralph Nader (Green Party) stood. His votes, which might have gone to Al Gore if he had not run, could then have possibly prevented Bush's presidency.

=== Fridays for Future ===
Some of the members of the Klimalisten are or were active in Fridays for Future and other climate activist groups. In Baden-Württemberg, the Fridays for Future saw themselves so appropriated that they publicly distanced themselves.
