= 2002 Saxony-Anhalt state election =

State election in Saxony-Anhalt, Germany

- 21 April 2002

All 115 seats in the Landtag of Saxony-Anhalt 58 seats needed for a majority
- Turnout: 1,160,985 (56.5%) ▼15.0%
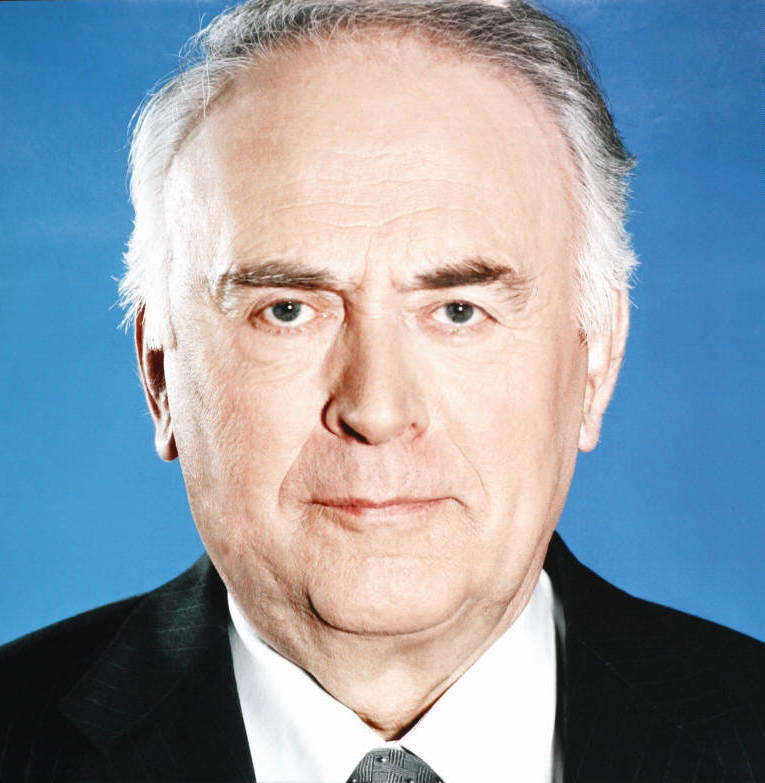

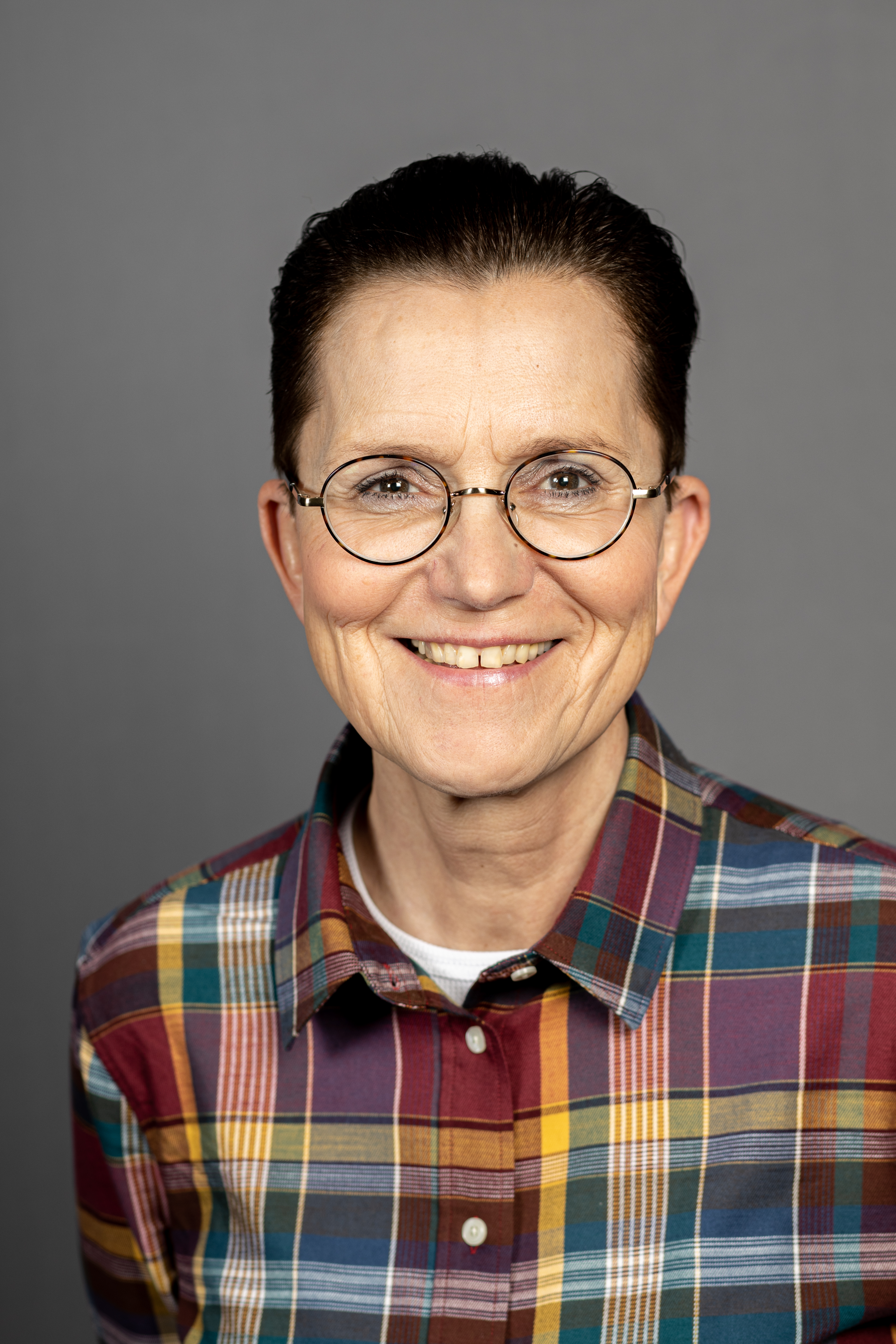

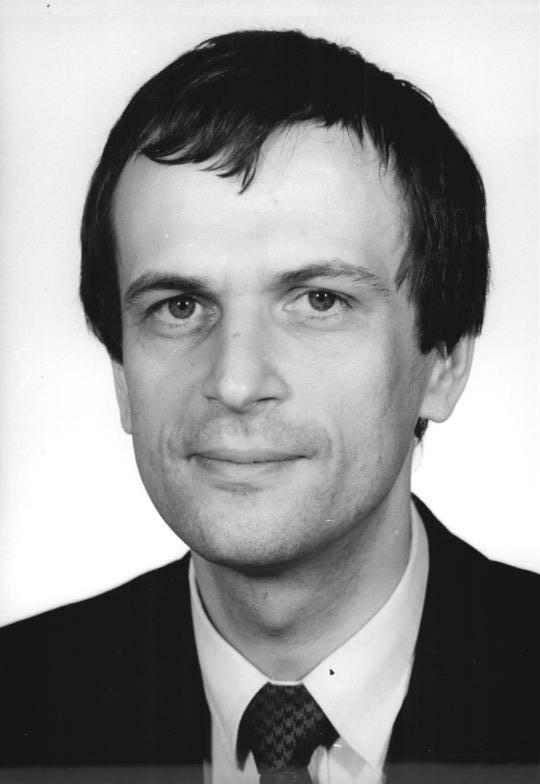
	First party	Second party
Leader	Wolfgang Böhmer	Petra Sitte
Party	CDU	PDS
Last election	28 seats, 22.0%	25 seats, 19.6%
Seats won	48	25
Seat change	▲20	0
Popular vote	433,521	236,484
Percentage	37.3%	20.4%
Swing	▲15.3%	▲0.8%
	Third party	Fourth party
Leader	Reinhard Höppner
Party	SPD	FDP
Last election	47 seats, 35.9%	0 seats, 4.2%
Seats won	25	17
Seat change	▼22	▲17
Popular vote	231,732	154,145
Percentage	20.0%	13.3%
Swing	▼15.9%	▲9.1%
- Results for the single-member constituencies
Minister-President before election
Reinhard Höppner
SPD
Elected Minister-President
Wolfgang Böhmer
CDU

The 2002 Saxony-Anhalt state election was held on 21 April 2002 to elect the members of the 4th Landtag of Saxony-Anhalt. The incumbent Social Democratic Party (SPD) minority government led by Minister-President Reinhard Höppner was defeated. The SPD fell to third place, while the Christian Democratic Union (CDU) moved into first. The CDU subsequently formed a coalition with the Free Democratic Party (FDP), and CDU leader Wolfgang Böhmer was elected Minister-President.

The Christian Democratic Union (CDU) was the largest party in every election from the 2002 Saxony-Anhalt state election until the 2026 Saxony-Anhalt state election when the Alternative for Germany (AfD) overtook them.

== Background ==
After both the 1994 and 1998 state elections, the SPD formed a minority government with the external support of the Party of Democratic Socialism (PDS). This marked the first time the PDS had been involved in determining government in a German state, and was a unique arrangement, dubbed the "Magdeburg model" after the capital of Saxony-Anhalt. In Germany, governments are typically coalition governments, in which the parties which support the government take part in cabinet and hold a majority of seats between them. However, the SPD/PDS arrangement functioned on a model of "tolerance", in which the PDS remained outside cabinet and abstained from the vote for Minister-President, rather than voting in favour, allowing the SPD to form a minority government. In 1994, this allowed the investment of an SPD–Green minority government; in 1998, after the Greens lost their Landtag representation, the SPD governed alone.

== Campaign and issues ==
At the time, Saxony-Anhalt was the "poorest" state of Germany, and that with the highest unemployment rate. The state election campaign was also influenced by the upcoming federal election.

The German People's Union, which won 12.9% of the vote and 12 seats in 1998, did not run in the election. This came after internal strife and the secession of the Freedom and Democracy People's Party (FDVP), which did run in the election.

== Parties ==
The table below lists parties represented in the 3rd Landtag of Saxony-Anhalt.

Name		Ideology	Leader(s)	1998 result	
Name		Ideology	Leader(s)	Votes (%)	Seats
SPD	Social Democratic Party of Germany; Sozialdemokratische Partei Deutschlands	Social democracy	Reinhard Höppner	35.9%	47 / 116
CDU	Christian Democratic Union of Germany; Christlich Demokratische Union Deutschlands	Christian democracy	Wolfgang Böhmer	22.0%	28 / 116
PDS	Party of Democratic Socialism; Partei des Demokratischen Sozialismus	Democratic socialism		19.6%	25 / 116
DVU	German People's Union; Deutsche Volksunion	German nationalism		12.9%	16 / 116

== Opinion polling ==
Polling firm	Fieldwork date	Sample size	SPD	CDU	PDS	DVU	FDP	Grüne	Schill	Others	Lead
2002 state election	21 Apr 2002	–	20.0	37.3	20.4	–	13.3	2.0	4.5	2.6	16.9
Forsa	19 Apr 2002	?	24	34	22	–	10	2	6	2	10
Infratest dimap	5–9 Apr 2002	1,000	25	32	23	–	9	2	5	4	7
Emnid	28 Mar 2002	?	24	33	26	–	8	2	5	2	9
Forschungsgruppe Wahlen	15 Mar 2002	?	28	36	19	–	7	3	4	3	8
Infratest dimap	21–26 Feb 2002	1,000	30	35	20	–	7	2	4	2	5
IfM Leipzig	25 Feb 2002	?	31	39	19	–	6	2	2	1	8
Forsa	24 Jan 2002	?	25	37	25	–	7	2	2	2	12
Uni Halle	17 Jan 2002	?	29.3	40.6	19.3	–	6.7	2.1	1.8	0.2	11.3
Infratest dimap	11–16 Dec 2001	1,000	31	35	20	2	5	2	3	2	4
Uni Halle	28 Aug 2001	?	37.4	33.0	18.3	–	7.5	3.0	–	0.8	4.4
1998 state election	26 Apr 1998	–	35.9	22.0	19.6	12.9	4.2	3.2	–	2.2	13.9

== Election result ==
Summary of the 21 April 2002 election results for the Landtag of Saxony-Anhalt
Party	Votes	%	+/-	Seats	+/-	Seats %
Christian Democratic Union (CDU)	433,521	37.3	▲15.3	48	▲20	41.7
Party of Democratic Socialism (PDS)	236,484	20.4	▲0.8	25	0	21.7
Social Democratic Party (SPD)	231,732	20.0	▼15.9	25	▼22	21.7
Free Democratic Party (FDP)	154,145	13.3	▲9.1	17	▲17	14.8
Party for a Rule of Law Offensive (Schill party)	52,589	4.5	New	0	New	0
Alliance 90/The Greens (Grüne)	22,696	2.0	▼1.2	0	±0	0
Others	29,818	2.6		0	±0	0
Total	1,160,985	100.0		115	▼1	
Voter turnout		56.5	▼15.0			

Popular Vote
CDU	37.34%
PDS	20.37%
SPD	19.96%
FDP	13.28%
SCHILL	4.53%
GRÜNE	1.95%
Other	2.57%

Landtag seats
CDU	41.74%
PDS	21.74%
SPD	21.74%
FDP	14.78%

== Outcome ==
The SPD suffered a major defeat, falling to third place behind both the CDU and PDS. The CDU became the largest party with 37% of the vote. The FDP achieved an unexpected victory with 13% of the vote. The Party for a Rule of Law Offensive (Schill party) failed to win seats, despite polling suggesting they would narrowly enter the Landtag.

While polls before the election indicated the SPD and PDS would likely retain a slim majority, the success of the FDP at the SPD's expense meant that the CDU and FDP held a comfortable majority between them. Thus, the PDS-backed SPD government no longer had the numbers to retain power. The CDU and FDP negotiated a coalition, with CDU leader Wolfgang Böhmer heading the new government.

The election, which took place five months before the 2002 federal election, was a major defeat for the federal SPD–Green government, and weakened its standing in the Bundesrat.

== Sources ==
- The Federal Returning Officer
