= Schulze =

Schulze is a German occupational surname meaning "village headman".

== Notable people ==
- Andrew Schulze (1896–1982), clergyman and civil rights activist
- Christina Schulze (born 1964)
- Edmund Schulze (1824–1878), German organ builder, or four previous generations of his family in the same profession
- Ernst Schulze, multiple people
- Frank Schulze (born 1970), German footballer
- Franz Hermann Schulze-Delitzsch (1808–1883), German economist
- Franz Eilhard Schulze (1840–1921), German anatomist and zoologist
- Friedrich August Schulze (1770–1849), German novelist
- Gottlob Ernst Schulze (1761–1833), German professor and philosopher
- Hans-Joachim Schulze (born 1934), German musicologist and Bach scholar
- Harro Schulze-Boysen (1909–1942), left-wing German publicist, Luftwaffe officer, and anti-fascist resistance fighter
- Horst Schulze, founder of The Ritz-Carlton Hotel Company
- Horst Schulze (1921–2018), German actor and opera singer
- Joan Schulze (born 1936), American artist, lecturer, and poet
- Johann Heinrich Schulze (1687–1744), German academic, inventor of a primitive photogram
- John Schulze, multiple people
- Karl Schulze, German rower
- Klaus Schulze (1947–2022), German musician
- Klaus-Peter Schulze (born 1954), German politician
- Kurt Schulze (1894–1942), German resistance fighter
- Lara Schulze (born 2002), German chess master
- Ludwig Schulze, Papua New Guinean politician
- Luisa Schulze (born 1990), German handball player
- Luise Schulze-Berghof (1889–1970), German composer, pianist, and teacher
- Mark Schulze, rugby player
- Martin Schulze Wessel, German historian
- Maximilian Schulze Niehues, German footballer
- Paul Schulze, multiple people
  - Paul Schulze (born 1962), American actor
- Richard Schulze, multiple people
- Sven Schulze (born 1979), German politician, minister-president of Saxony-Anhalt (2026–)
- Thomas Schulze (born 1964), German civil servant, restaurateur and politician
- Tobias Schulze (born 1976), German politician
- William August Schulze, rocket scientist recruited in 1945 by "Operation Paperclip"
- Willibald Schulze, German writer

== See also ==
- Schulze method, a single-winner election method
- Schulze STV, a method of proportional representation by the single transferable vote
- Müller-Schulze Gambit, a chess gambit
- Schulze Baking Company Plant
- Schütze (surname)
