= 2026 Saxony-Anhalt state election =

State election in Germany

- 6 September 2026

All 83 seats in the Landtag of Saxony-Anhalt 42 seats needed for a majority
- Turnout: 1,328,211 (77.8%) ▲17.5 pp
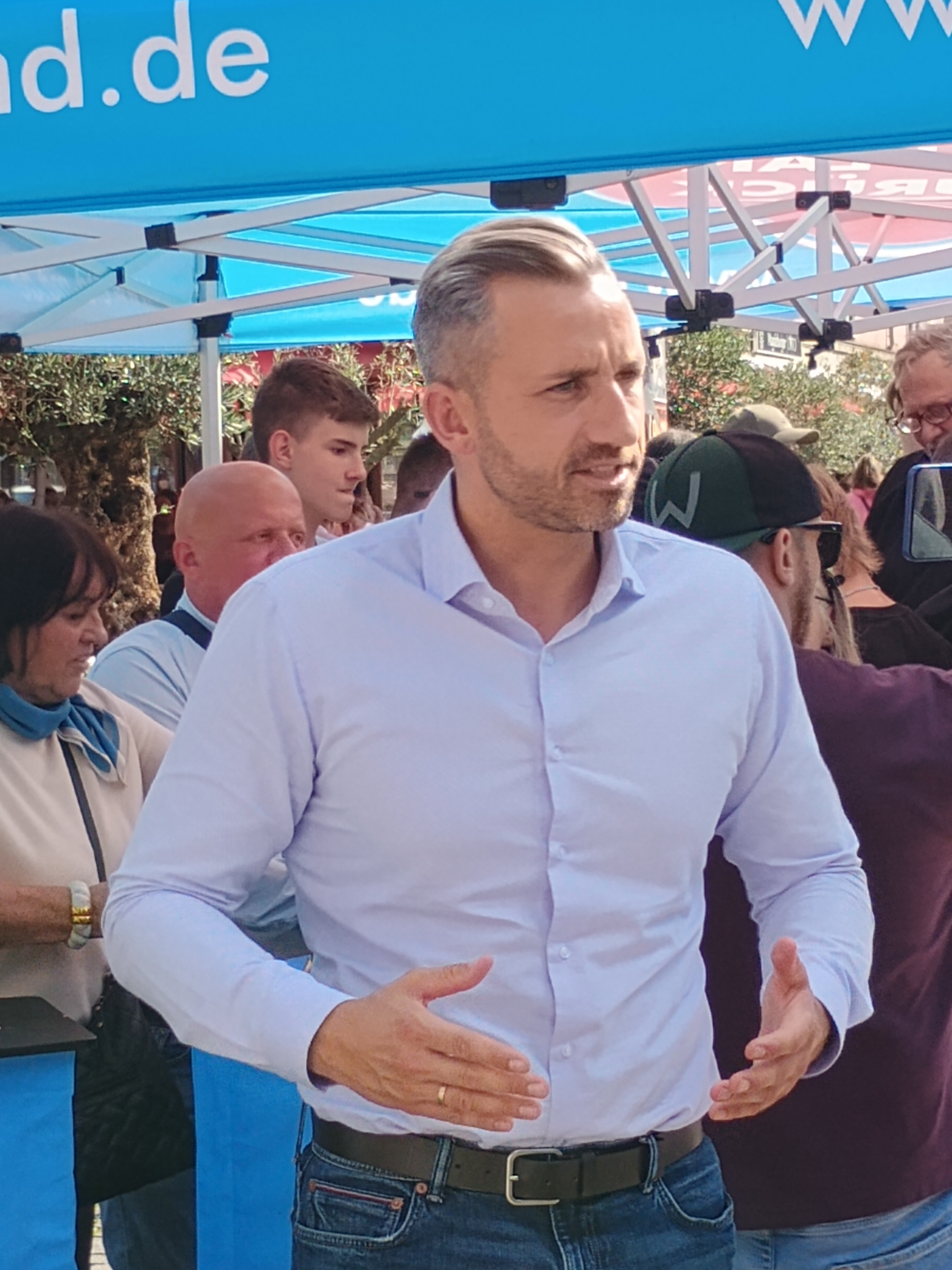

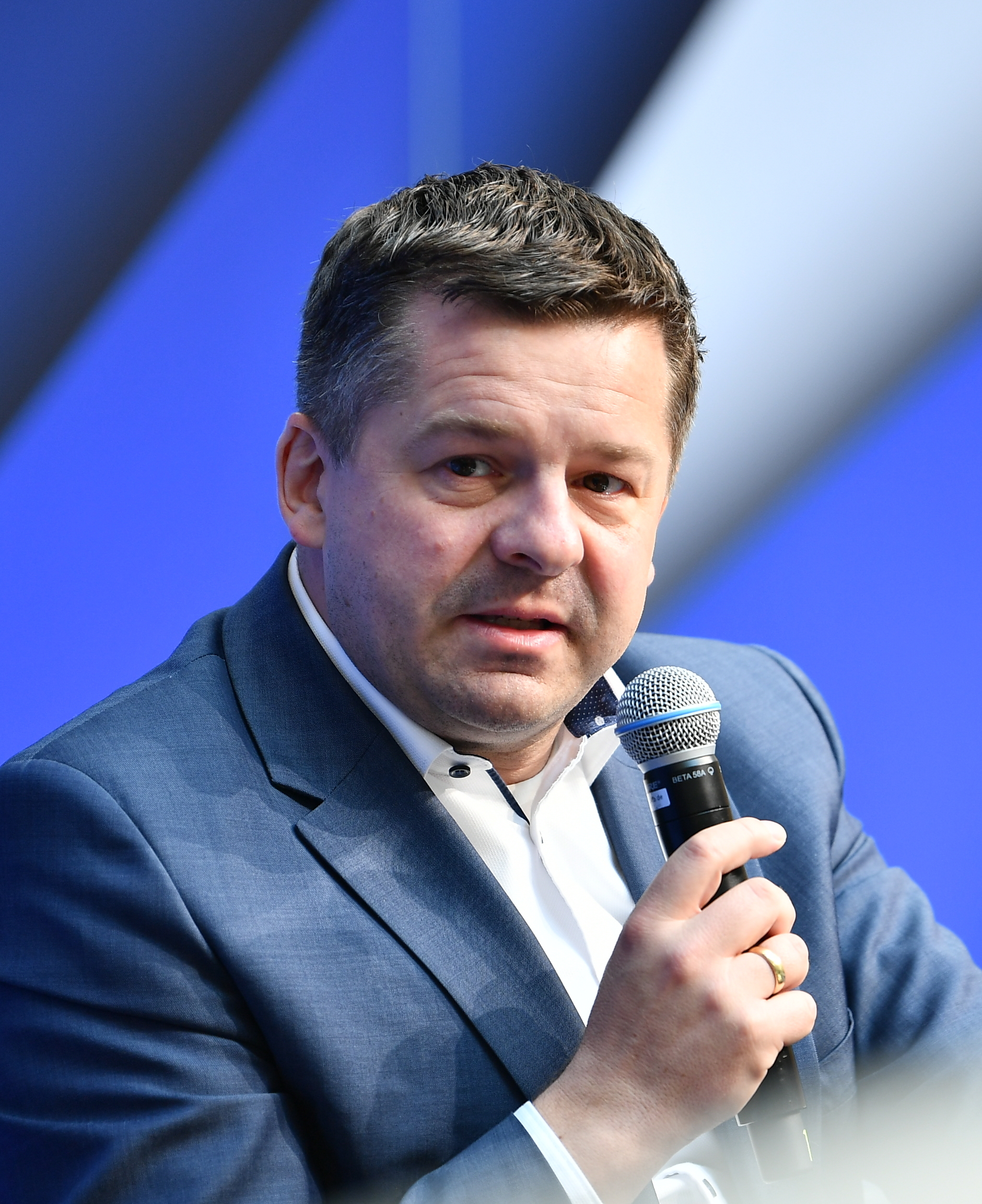

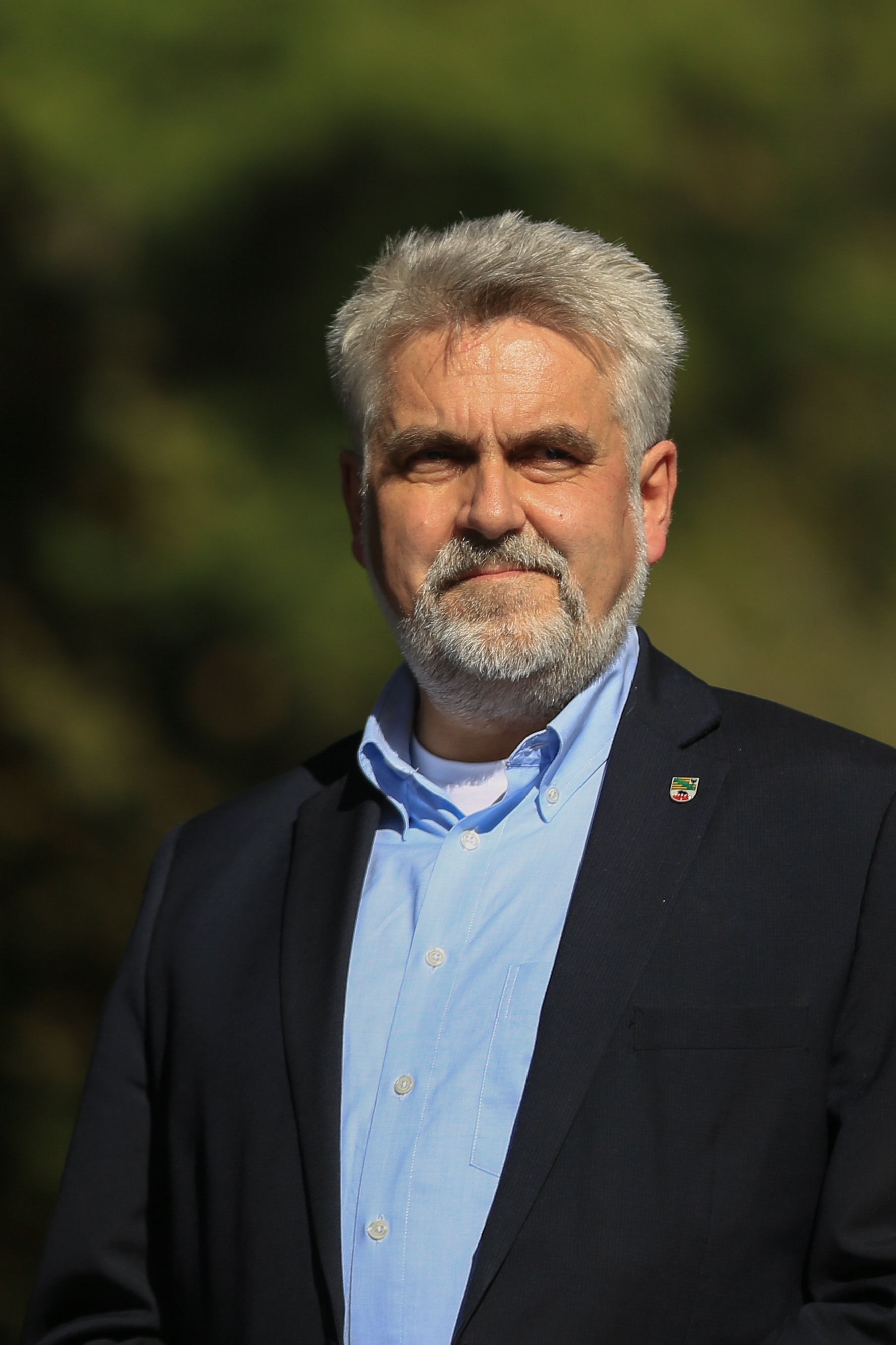

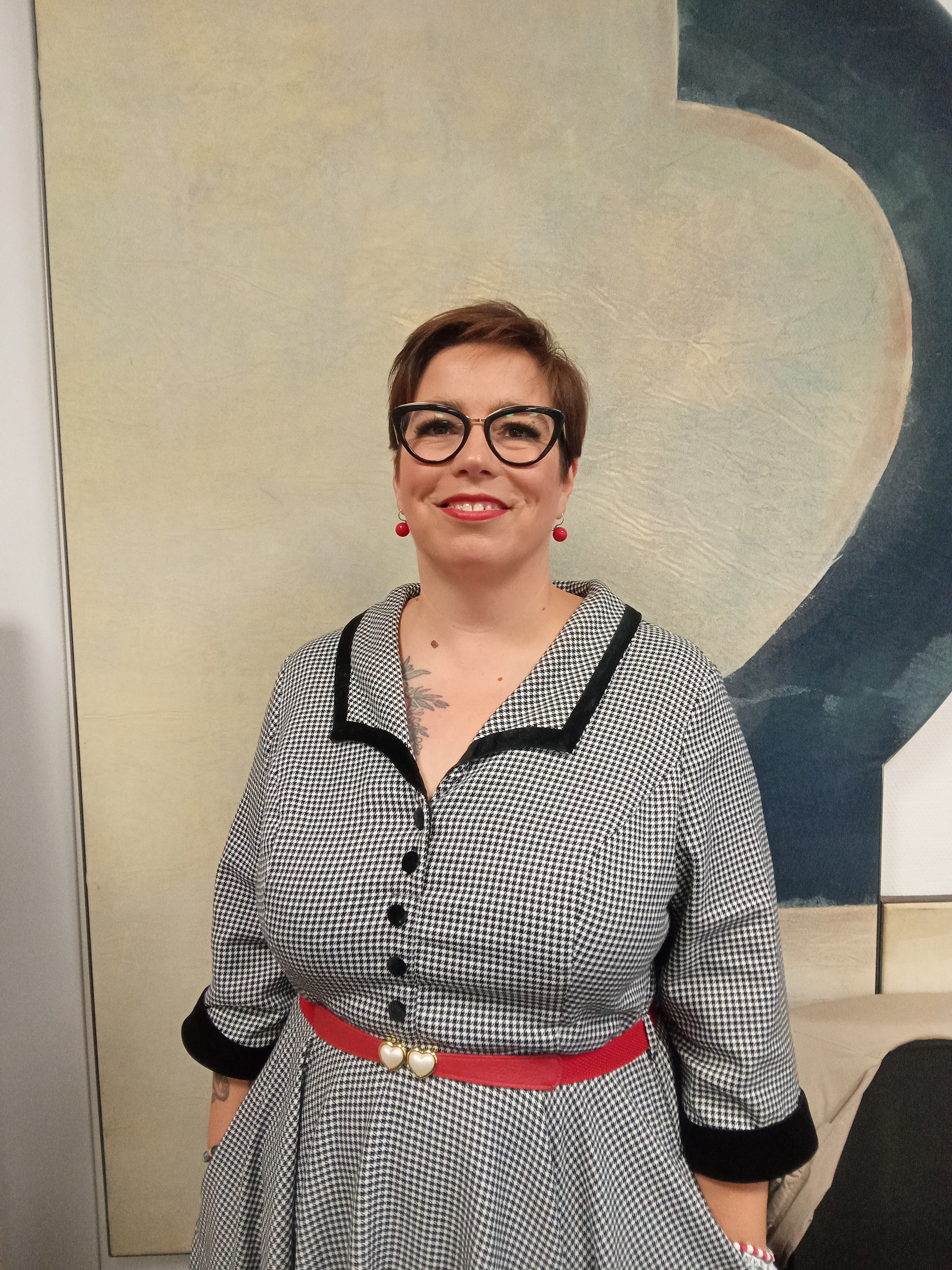

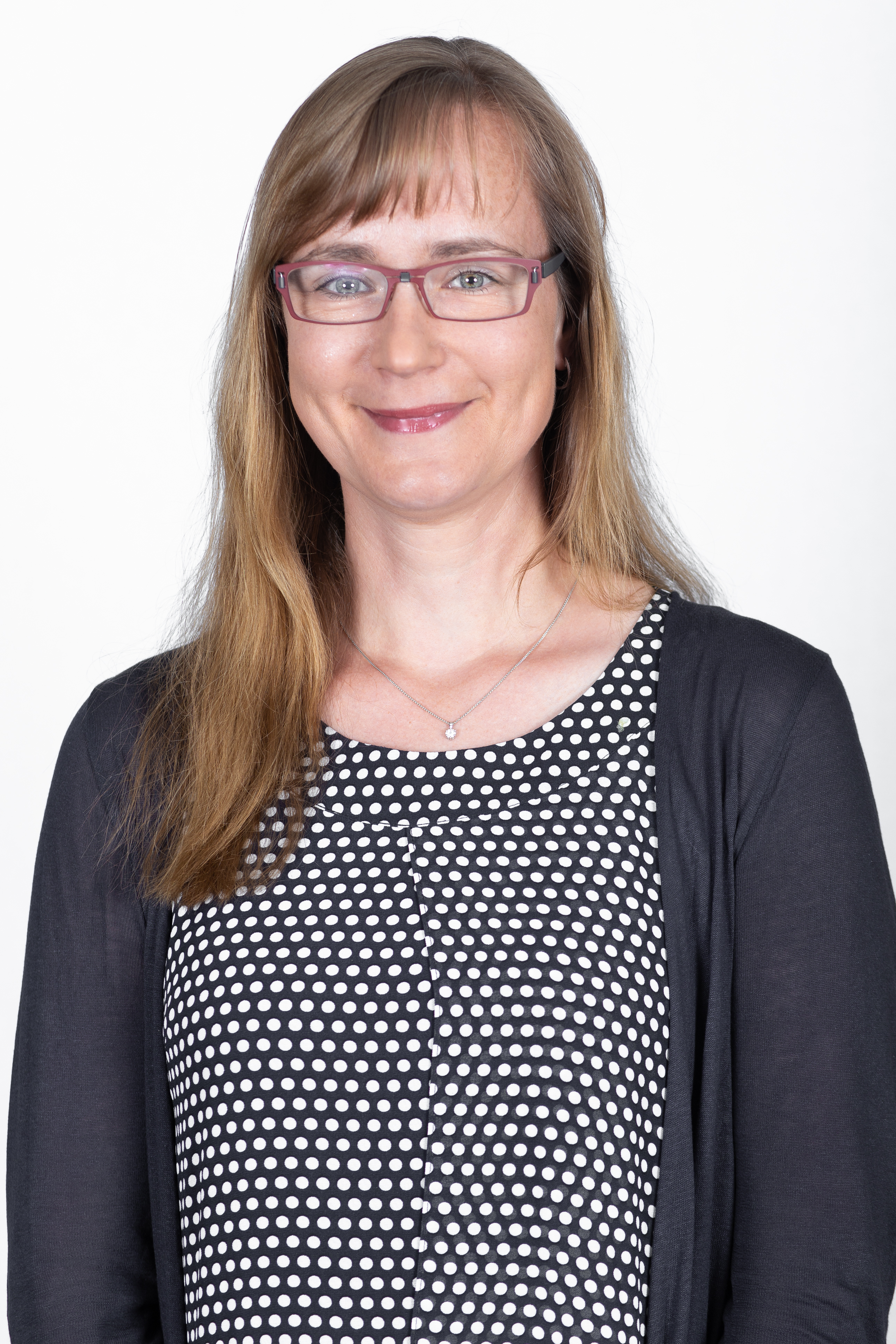

	First party	Second party	Third party
Leader	Ulrich Siegmund	Sven Schulze	Armin Willingmann
Party	AfD	CDU	SPD
Last election	23 seats, 20.8%	40 seats, 37.1%	9 seats, 8.4%
Seats won	39	15	8
Seat change	▲16	▼25	▼1
Popular vote	576,037	226,622	122,303
Percentage	43.8%	17.2%	9.3%
Swing	▲23.0pp	▼19.9pp	▲0.9pp
	Fourth party	Fifth party	Sixth party
Leader	Susan Sziborra-Seidlitz	Eva von Angern	Thomas Schulze & Claudia Wittig
Party	Greens	Left	BSW
Last election	6 seats, 5.9%	12 seats, 11.0%	Did not exist
Seats won	8	8	5
Seat change	▲2	▼4	New
Popular vote	117,498	112,541	69,291
Percentage	8.9%	8.6%	5.3%
Swing	▲3.0pp	▼2.4pp	New
- Largest party in each single-member constituency
Government before election
Schulze cabinet
CDU–SPD–FDP
Government after election
TBD
TBD

The 2026 Saxony-Anhalt state election was held on 6 September 2026 to elect the 9th Landtag of Saxony-Anhalt. It took place two weeks before the state elections in Berlin and in Mecklenburg-Vorpommern. This election drew significant national and international attention due to the performance of the Alternative for Germany (AfD), including the possibility of it getting an absolute majority. The far-right AfD is subject to a firewall policy as all other major parties refuse to cooperate with it; its state branch is under surveillance by the Federal Office for the Protection of the Constitution, which classified it as a "right-wing extremist movement" in 2023.

The AfD secured a plurality of the vote, doubling its support to 43.8%, but failed to gain a majority of seats. The governing Christian Democratic Union (CDU) lost more than half of its previous vote share with 17.2%. The Social Democratic Party (SPD), Alliance 90/The Greens, and The Left each got about 9%. The Sahra Wagenknecht Alliance (BSW) barely passed the 5% election threshold, while the Free Democratic Party (FDP) lost representation.

Voter turnout was an all-time high of 77.8%, up from 60% in 2021. The AfD candidates won 38 of the 41 single-member constituencies, with the remaining three won by The Left. The size of the parliament matches the nominal 83 seats for the first time as the AfD's result is large enough that there are no overhang seats. A tactical voting campaign supported the SPD and Greens, which were polling at or below the election threshold in the summer, and both ended with small gains compared to 2021.

== Background ==
In Saxony-Anhalt, the CDU has been the largest political party since the 2002 Saxony-Anhalt state election. In the 2021 Saxony-Anhalt state election, the CDU emerged again as the strongest party. The AfD experienced slight losses but remained the second-largest force. Contrary to pre-election predictions of a tight race between the CDU and the AfD, the CDU secured a 16-percentage-point lead over the AfD. The Left also recorded losses, achieving 11% of the vote. The SPD suffered its worst result in Saxony-Anhalt's history. With 6.4% of the vote, the FDP returned to the state parliament after a decade-long absence. The Greens secured 5.9%, retaining parliamentary representation.

The AfD has remained subject to Germany's firewall policy, under which the country's major political parties exclude cooperation with the party. Its state branch is also monitored by the Federal Office for the Protection of the Constitution (BfV). The branch was classified as a "confirmed right-wing extremist movement" in 2023, a designation that has continued to be reflected in subsequent assessments by the authorities. The classification followed the branch's designation as a suspected extremist case in 2021 and was based on information collected by the state constitutional protection authority concerning positions it considered incompatible with the principles of human dignity, democracy, and the rule of law.

Due to the small majority and potential fragility of a grand coalition between the CDU and the SPD, the FDP was included and formed a black-red-yellow coalition, with the same political colors as the German flag and thus known as the "Germany coalition", consisting of all three parties that were represented in the West-Germany-only Bundestag from 1961 to 1983. Reiner Haseloff (CDU) was re-elected as Minister-President only in the second ballot. The coalition government held a clear majority in the state parliament with 56 of the 97 seats. Haseloff retired in January 2026 and was replaced by Sven Schulze. The 2026 state elections in Berlin and in Mecklenburg-Vorpommern were to be held two weeks later, with the possibility that a strong AfD result in Saxony-Anhalt could shape the dynamics of the other two elections, potentially mobilising support for the leading left-leaning parties.

== Election date ==
According to Article 43 of the State Constitution, the state election must take place between the 58th and 62nd month after the start of the legislative period, unless the period is terminated early. The 8th Landtag of Saxony-Anhalt had its first session on 6 July 2021. Consequently, possible election dates initially included all Sundays and public holidays between 10 May and 6 September 2026. In May 2025, the state parliament designated 6 September 2026, thus the last possible day, as the election date.

== Electoral system ==
In Saxony-Anhalt state elections, there used to be more abstentions (Nichtwähler) than voters for any party until in 2026 turnout rose to 77.8% and AfD won 43.8% of votes and 34% of all eligible voters.

The State Parliament of Saxony-Anhalt consists of at least 83 members, although this number may increase due to overhang and compensatory mandates. Of these, 41 members are directly elected in constituencies, while the remaining seats are allocated to parties based on their state lists. Each voter has two votes: a first vote (Erststimme) to elect a constituency representative and a second vote (Zweitstimme) to select a party's state list, which determines the proportional distribution of seats in the parliament. The allocation of seats is governed by the Hare-Niemeyer method, with only parties receiving at least 5% of the valid second votes considered for proportional distribution. The State Election Committee oversees the process, first determining the total second votes cast for each state list. Seats are then distributed as follows:

1. The committee identifies the number of seats won by independent constituency candidates and by parties that fail to meet the 5% threshold. These are subtracted from the base number of 83 seats to calculate the seats available for proportional allocation.
2. The remaining seats are distributed among qualifying parties based on their second vote totals. Each party's share is calculated by multiplying the total seats by the party's second votes, divided by the total second votes of all qualifying parties. Whole seats are assigned first, and any remaining seats are allocated based on the highest fractional remainders. In case of ties, a lottery conducted by the State Election Officer decides.
3. If a party with over half of the second votes receives less than half of the available seats, it is awarded an additional seat before further distribution.
4. Seats won in constituencies are deducted from a party's total allocated seats, with the remainder filled from the party's state list in the order specified. Candidates already elected in constituencies are excluded from the state list allocation.
5. Overhang mandates occur when a party wins more constituency seats than its proportional share. In such cases, the total number of parliamentary seats increases by twice the number of overhang seats, and the distribution process is repeated. If overhang seats persist, they are retained by the party, and the total number of seats is adjusted accordingly. This process continues until the overhang seats no longer exceed half the number required to form a parliamentary group, calculated as the seats a hypothetical party with 5% of second votes would receive.
6. Non-elected candidates on state lists of parties securing at least one seat are designated as substitutes in the order determined by the State Election Committee, excluding those already elected in constituencies. The election adheres to the provisions of the Saxony-Anhalt Election Law (Landeswahlgesetz, LWG), as published on 18 February 2010, and the state's electoral regulations.

== Parties ==
#	Name		Ideology	Lead Candidate	2021 result	
#	Name		Ideology	Lead Candidate	Votes (%)	Seats
1	CDU	Christian Democratic Union of Germany; Christlich Demokratische Union Deutschlands	Christian democracy	Sven Schulze	37.1%	40 / 97
2	AfD	Alternative for Germany; Alternative für Deutschland	Right-wing populism	Ulrich Siegmund	20.8%	23 / 97
3	Linke	The Left; Die Linke	Democratic socialism	Eva von Angern	11.0%	12 / 97
4	SPD	Social Democratic Party of Germany; Sozialdemokratische Partei Deutschlands	Social democracy	Armin Willingmann	8.4%	9 / 97
5	FDP	Free Democratic Party; Freie Demokratische Partei	Classical liberalism	Lydia Hüskens	6.4%	7 / 97
6	Grüne	Alliance 90/The Greens; Bündnis 90/Die Grünen	Green politics	Susan Sziborra-Seidlitz	5.9%	6 / 97

The following minor parties submitted a state list of candidates to the returning officer and were approved to appear on the ballot:

- Free Voters (FW)
- Grassroots Democratic Party of Germany (dieBasis)
- Party Human Climate Animal-Protection (Tierschutzpartei)
- Garden Party (Gartenpartei)
- The Party for Labour, Rule of Law, Animal Protection, Promotion of Elites and Grassroots Democratic Initiative (Die PARTEI)
- Alliance for Human Rights, Animal and Nature Protection (Tierschutzallianz)
- Sahra Wagenknecht Alliance (BSW)
- Party of Progress (PdF)
- Volt Germany (Volt)

== Campaign ==
Various election posters in Magdeburg

=== Lead candidates ===
==== CDU ====
Then Minister-President Reiner Haseloff announced on 7 August 2025 that he would not seek re-election in 2026. Sven Schulze was selected to be the CDU's lead candidate. On 28 January 2026, Schulze was elected Minister-President. Previously, he had served as a member of the European Parliament for seven years. In 2021, he became the CDU's state chairman. Schulze was the State Minister for Economic Affairs in the Third Haseloff cabinet.

==== AfD ====
In a state party conference in Magdeburg, Ulrich Siegmund was selected by the AfD to be its lead candidate, getting 98.3% of the votes. Since 2016, Siegmund has been a member of the Landtag. In 2022, Oliver Kirchner, chair of the AfD parliamentary group in Saxony-Anhalt, proposed that both of them could be lead candidate. Shortly after, Siegmund began co-chairing the parliamentary group with Kirchner. Siegmund was chair of the social affairs committee until February 2024 when the parliament voted to remove him from the role due to his participation in the 2023 Potsdam far-right meeting.

The AfD campaign focused on restrictive immigration and remigration, including a proposed "deportation and remigration offensive" and tighter immigration controls. It proposed separate classes for refugee children as part of its education policy. The party also called for replacing compulsory schooling with a general education requirement and proposed a cash "welcome bonus" for each newborn. It sought to reduce public broadcasting to a "basic service" and to reverse the energy transition in favour of fossil fuels and nuclear power. Its programme also called for stricter asylum and security policies, including faster deportations and expanded detention capacity for deportees. Finally, it advocated a more explicitly patriotic cultural policy, including replacing the state's #moderndenken campaign with #deutschdenken, and replacing rainbow flags with German flags on public buildings.

On 13 August 2026, German weekly news magazine Der Spiegel had a mug-shot style photo of him on its cover, calling him "the most dangerous man in Germany". Siegmund used the magazine cover for his campaign, signing many copies, while Der Spiegel had to defend the move. During an AfD campaign event in Dessau-Roßlau (Saxony-Anhalt) in July 2026, AfD co-leader Tino Chrupalla and Ulrich Siegmund would sing the former East German (GDR) national anthem "Risen from Ruins", and afterwards the German national anthem was also sung. Martin Huber from the Christian Social Union in Bavaria (CSU) criticised the playing of the former GDR anthem.

==== Left ====
Eva von Angern was selected to be the Left's lead candidate after getting a large majority of votes at a party conference in Leuna. She was nominated by the party's two state chairs: Janina Böttger and Hendrik Lange. Von Angern has been a member of the state parliament since 2002 and deputy chair of the Left's state parliamentary group from 2014 until she became the chair in 2020. Additionally, she was the lead candidate for her party in the 2021 Saxony-Anhalt state election, where the Left suffered record losses, although Dietmar Bartsch, the then-leader of The Left's national parliamentary group, argued that this was partly due to tactical voting.

==== SPD ====
Getting votes from 97 of the 98 delegates, Armin Willingmann was elected the lead candidate for the SPD at a party conference in Quedlinburg. Earlier, the party's state executive committee unanimously voted to nominate him for the position. During the Second Haseloff cabinet, Willingmann served as State Secretary in the Ministry of Economic Affairs and Science for 6 months before becoming the Minister. In 2021, he ran to represent the constituency of Wernigerode in the state parliament. He came in second place, but was still able to become a member of parliament via the party list. In October 2021, Willingmann resigned from the state parliament and joined the Third Haseloff cabinet as the Minister of Science, Energy, Climate Protection and the Environment. After Minister-President Haseloff resigned, Willingmann maintained this position in the newly announced Schulze cabinet. In 2022, he was elected deputy chair of his party's state parliamentary group.

==== FDP ====
On 6 November 2025, the FDP's state delegates' assembly voted to select Lydia Hüskens, Minister of Infrastructure and Digitalization and Second Deputy Minister-President in the Third Haseloff cabinet and Schulze cabinet since 2021, as the party's lead candidate.

==== Greens ====
The Greens' state party conference in Wittenberg selected Susan Sziborra-Seidlitz as the party's lead candidate. 66 out of the 90 delegates voted for her. Since 2016, Sziborra-Seidlitz has been one of her party's state chairs. In 2021, she was elected to the state parliament, entering through the party list.

==== BSW ====
Due to internal party conflicts at the state level, the BSW selected two lead candidates: Thomas Schulze and Claudia Wittig. Neither of them have held public office before.

=== Potential coalitions ===
In 2018, the federal CDU passed a "resolution of incompatibility" which prohibits itself from entering into a "coalition or any similar form of cooperation" with the AfD and Left at any level. With polls in the run-up to the election showing the only possible majority coalition not involving the AfD would be a four-way CDU–SPD–Green–Left coalition (a first in Germany), federal CDU leader and Chancellor Friedrich Merz reiterated in an interview with local newspapers that there would be no cooperation with the Left. He noted that a situation similar to the minority Voigt cabinet in Thuringia, where The Left positions itself as a "constructive opposition" and supports the government in what amounts to an unwritten confidence and supply agreement, may be possible. The Left's federal leadership also signaled its openness to this arrangement. On 3 September, members of the CDU district committee in Harz, the largest in the state, proposed a resolution that would reject any cooperation with The Left, including accepting its tolerance of a minority government. Schulze dismissed it as "the opinion of a single party member", and said that nothing permanent had been decided and he would not discuss the topic before the election.

BSW leading figure Sahra Wagenknecht called on the party to undertake "issue-based" work with all other parties, including the AfD, under an independent Minister-President should it enter the Landtag. This did not extend to entering a formal coalition with the AfD. She also called for the end of "firewall idiocy", referring to the cordon sanitaire around the AfD; lead candidate Claudia Wittig termed the refusal of cooperation with the AfD "undemocratic" and said it would only lead to deadlock. The issue of potential cooperation with the AfD led to 13 of the 15 BSW MdLs in neighboring Thuringia, as well as its entire state leadership there, leaving the party in the week before this election. The BSW had participated in Germany's only blackberry coalition in that state, although throughout the summer of 2026 Wagenknecht repeatedly urged state party leaders to end the coalition and support the same model of an independent Minister-President.

To prevent a possible AfD-led government, an outside political initiative called for tactical voting to support the smaller parties, mainly the SPD and Greens; either party failing to enter the Landtag would lower the percentage threshold required for an AfD majority. In a 30 August joint op-ed in the Frankfurter Allgemeine Zeitung, federal defense minister Boris Pistorius (SPD) and Baden-Württemberg Minister-President Cem Özdemir (Greens) called on the government to swiftly begin proceedings before the Federal Constitutional Court to ban the AfD. Per Article 21 of the Basic Law, the Federal Constitutional Court has the authority to determine that a party is anti-democratic, and anti-democratic parties are prohibited.

== Opinion polls ==
Saxony-Anhalt state election polls since 2022

Polling firm	Fieldwork date	Sample size	CDU	AfD	Linke	SPD	FDP	Grüne	BSW	Others	Lead
2026 state election	6 Sep 2026	–	17.2	43.8	8.6	9.3	2.6	8.9	5.3	4.4	26.6
Forschungsgruppe Wahlen	1–3 Sep 2026	1,044	23	41	11.5	8.5	3	6	4	3	18
INSA (Note: Commissioned by Nius, a right-wing populist news portal, which is not a member of the German Press Council and thus is not subject to its ethical standards. Other INSA polls that are listed are commissioned by Bild.)	26 Aug – 1 Sep 2026	1,000	22	43	12	7	3	5	4	4	21
Forschungsgruppe Wahlen	25–27 Aug 2026	1,053	23	40	13	9	3	6	3	3	17
Infratest dimap	24–25 Aug 2026	1,511	22	42	11	8	3	6	4	4	20
Geostrategy	17–21 Aug 2026	1,000	20	43	13	7	4	5	4	4	23
pollytix	3–8 Aug 2026	2,604	23	43	13	7	2	5	4	3	20
INSA	31 Jul – 6 Aug 2026	1,000	22	42	13	6	4	4	5	4	20
Infratest dimap	23–28 Jul 2026	1,149	24	41	13	7	–	5	4	6	17
INSA	14–21 Jul 2026	1,000	24	41	14	5	4	4	4	4	17
INSA	23–30 Jun 2026	1,000	23	41	13	6	4	4	5	4	18
INSA	5–12 May 2026	1,000	24	42	13	6	3	4	4	4	18
Infratest dimap	29 Apr – 5 May 2026	1,164	26	41	12	7	–	4	4	6	15
INSA	17–24 Mar 2026	1,000	25	38	13	6	3	4	5	6	13
INSA	20–27 Jan 2026	1,000	26	39	11	8	2	3	6	5	13
INSA	7–14 Oct 2025	1,000	26	40	11	6	3	3	6	5	14
Infratest dimap	28 Aug – 2 Sep 2025	1,167	27	39	13	7	–	3	6	5	12
INSA	10–17 Jun 2025	1,000	34	30	11	7	2	3	8	5	4
Federal election	23 Feb 2025	–	19.2	37.1	10.8	11.0	3.1	4.4	11.2	3.3	17.9
INSA	8–13 Jan 2025	1,000	32	31	4	8	4	3	14	4	1
INSA	21–28 Oct 2024	1,000	32	30	3	7	4	3	16	5	2
INSA	24 Jun – 5 Jul 2024	1,000	29	29	4	8	4	4	16	6	Tie
INSA	3–11 Jun 2024	1,000	31	30	5	7	4	4	13	6	1
European Parliament election	9 Jun 2024	–	22.8	30.5	4.8	8.7	2.5	3.9	15.0	11.8	7.7
INSA	10–17 Apr 2024	1,000	32	29	5	8	4	5	10	7	3
Wahlkreisprognose	21–29 Jan 2024	1,000	34.5	32.5	6	5	7	5.5	–	9.5	2
INSA	16–23 Oct 2023	1,000	32	33	9	8	4	5	–	9	1
INSA	21–26 Jun 2023	1,000	31	29	9	9	6	6	–	10	2
Wahlkreisprognose	16–28 May 2023	732	37	26	10	12	6	4	–	5	11
INSA	6–13 Mar 2023	1,000	35	26	11	8	6	7	–	7	9
Wahlkreisprognose	6–13 Jan 2023	982	31.5	26	10	13	4.5	4.5	–	10.5	5.5
Wahlkreisprognose	7–15 Jun 2022	1,000	33	23	9	15	5	6	–	9	10
Infratest dimap	17–22 Feb 2022	1,161	33	20	11	16	6	5	–	9	13
Wahlkreisprognose	13–21 Feb 2022	1,005	33	20	9	19	6.5	5	–	7.5	13
Federal election	26 Sep 2021	–	21.0	19.6	9.6	25.4	9.5	6.5	–	8.4	4.4
2021 state election	6 Jun 2021	–	37.1	20.8	11.0	8.4	6.4	5.9	–	10.4	16.3

=== Minister-President polling ===
Polling firm	Fieldwork date	Sample size			None/ Unsure/ Don't know	Lead
Polling firm	Fieldwork date	Sample size	Schulze CDU	Siegmund AfD	None/ Unsure/ Don't know	Lead
Forschungsgruppe Wahlen	1–3 Sep 2026	1,044	48	34	18	14
INSA	26 Aug – 1 Sep 2026	1,000	28	39	33	11
Forschungsgruppe Wahlen	25–27 Aug 2026	1,053	48	32	20	16
Infratest dimap	24–25 Aug 2026	1,511	41	39	20	2
INSA	23–30 Jun 2026	1,000	28	32	40	4
INSA	5–12 May 2026	1,000	28	30	42	2
Infratest dimap	29 Apr – 5 May 2026	1,164	36	32	32	4

== Results ==
Party	Constituency				Party list				Total seats	+/–
Party	Votes	%	+/–	Seats	Votes	%	+/–	Seats	Total seats	+/–
Alternative for Germany (AfD)	581,945	44.33	▲22.49pp	38	576,037	43.79	▲22.97pp	1	39	▲16
Christian Democratic Union (CDU)	314,535	23.96	▼10.17pp	0	226,622	17.23	▼19.89pp	15	15	▼25
Social Democratic Party (SPD)	102,881	7.84	▼3.14pp	0	122,303	9.30	▲0.89pp	8	8	▼1
Alliance 90/The Greens (Grüne)	45,310	3.45	▼2.25pp	0	117,498	8.93	▲3.00pp	8	8	▲2
The Left (Linke)	157,905	12.03	▼0.73pp	3	112,541	8.56	▼2.44pp	5	8	▼4
Sahra Wagenknecht Alliance (BSW)	41,782	3.18	New	0	69,291	5.27	New	5	5	▲5
Free Democratic Party (FDP)	41,113	3.13	▼3.53pp	0	33,969	2.58	▼3.84pp	0	0	▼7
Free Voters (FW)	14,464	1.10	▼4.32pp	0	15,430	1.17	▼1.96pp	0	0	−
Human Environment Animal Protection Party (Tierschutzpartei)	1,129	0.09	▼0.01pp	0	14,356	1.09	▼0.34pp	0	0	−
Garden Party (Gartenpartei)	2,937	0.22	▼0.08pp	0	7,482	0.57	▼0.24pp	0	0	−
Animal Protection Alliance (Tierschutzallianz)	999	0.08	▼0.35pp	0	7,283	0.55	▲0.07pp	0	0	−
Volt	768	0.06	New	0	4,339	0.33	New	0	0	New
Die PARTEI	777	0.06	▼0.31pp	0	3,487	0.27	▼0.47pp	0	0	−
Party of Progress (PdF)	2,680	0.20	New	0	2,778	0.21	New	0	0	New
Grassroots Democratic Party of Germany (dieBasis)					1,899	0.14	▼1.32pp	0	0	−
Die Heimat	325	0.02	−	0					0	−
Independents	3,184	0.24	▼0.05pp	0					0	−
Total	1,312,734	100.00	–	41	1,315,315	100.00	–	42	83	▼14
Valid votes	1,312,734	98.83	▲0.46pp		1,315,315	99.03	▲0.45pp			
Invalid/blank votes	15,477	1.17	▼0.46pp		12,896	0.97	▼0.45pp			
Total votes	1,328,211	100.00	–		1,328,211	100.00	–			
Registered voters/turnout	1,706,851	77.82	▲17.50pp		1,706,851	77.82	▲17.50pp			
Source: Statistisches Landesamt Sachsen-Anhalt

Popular vote
AfD	43.80%
CDU	17.23%
SPD	9.30%
GRÜNE	8.93%
LINKE	8.56%
BSW	5.27%
FDP	2.58%
Other	4.34%

Landtag seats
AfD	46.99%
CDU	18.07%
SPD	9.64%
GRÜNE	9.64%
LINKE	9.64%
BSW	6.02%

=== Constituencies and municipalities results ===
Winning party of the single-member-constituencies

Party with most list votes in each constituency

First vote by municipality

Second vote by municipality

=== Turnout ===
The voter turnout was unprecedentedly high, reaching 77.8%, which is almost identical to the 77.7% recorded in the state during the 2025 federal election and the highest ever recorded in a Landtag election in Saxony-Anhalt. It surpassed the previous record of 71.7% in 1998, and was 17.5 percentage points higher than in 2021, when turnout stood at 60.3%.

Turnout	Time														
Turnout	12:00			14:00			16:00			18:00			Final (Note: The figure includes postal votes.)		
Turnout	2021	2026	±	2021	2026	±	2021	2026	±	2021	2026	±	2021	2026	±
Total	22.4%	34.7%	▲12.3 pp	27.1%	54.4%	▲27.3 pp	41.0%	65.3%	▲24.3 pp	46.5%	–	–	60.3%	77.8%	▲17.5 pp
Source: Wahlrecht.de

=== Electorate ===
The electorate statistics, based on post-election surveys conducted by Infratest dimap, are as follows. (Note: Figures for "Other" are calculated as the remainder after the parties individually reported by Infratest dimap and may therefore be affected by rounding.) Electorate statistics by voter religion are based on data and post-election surveys from the Elections Research Group in Mannheim.

Demographic	CDU	AfD	Linke	SPD	FDP	Grüne	BSW	Other
Total vote	17.2%	43.8%	8.6%	9.3%	2.6%	8.9%	5.3%	4.4%
Sex
Men	15%	50%	8%	9%	2%	9%	4%	3%
Women	19%	39%	9%	10%	3%	9%	6%	5%
Age
18–24 years old	5%	41%	15%	9%	2%	14%	6%	8%
25–34 years old	6%	43%	13%	8%	2%	16%	6%	6%
35–44 years old	9%	52%	7%	7%	3%	12%	5%	5%
45–59 years old	13%	52%	6%	7%	3%	10%	5%	4%
60–69 years old	20%	47%	7%	8%	2%	6%	6%	4%
70+ years old	30%	31%	11%	13%	3%	5%	5%	2%
Employment status
Workers	9%	59%	7%	6%	3%	5%	6%	5%
Employees	12%	46%	9%	8%	3%	12%	5%	5%
Pensioners	26%	38%	9%	11%	2%	5%	5%	4%
Self-employed	18%	52%	3%	7%	5%	14%	0%	1%
Education
Lower secondary education	16%	57%	7%	8%	1%	3%	3%	5%
Higher secondary education	16%	52%	7%	8%	2%	5%	5%	5%
University degree	18%	30%	11%	12%	4%	16%	6%	3%
Personal economic situation
Good	20%	37%	9%	11%	3%	11%	5%	4%
Bad	8%	65%	8%	3%	1%	4%	6%	5%

=== Constituency results ===
Saxony-Anhalt has 41 Landtag constituencies in 2026. The AfD won 38 of them, some with over 50% of the vote, and the Left won three.

Constituency (FPTP) results by district
District	No.	Constituency	Winner	Party	Votes	%	Party	Votes	%	Margin
Altmarkkreis Salzwedel	1	Salzwedel	Simon Lansmann	AfD	10,778	41.58	CDU	6,674	25.75	15.83
Altmarkkreis Salzwedel	2	Gardelegen-Klötze	Sebastian Koch	AfD	13,709	41.54	CDU	8,658	26.24	15.30
Landkreis Stendal	3	Havelberg-Osterburg	Sebastian Killinger	AfD	12,555	46.53	CDU	6,275	23.26	23.27
Landkreis Stendal	4	Stendal	Matthias Büttner	AfD	11,475	42.55	CDU	6,659	24.69	17.86
Jerichower Land	5	Genthin	Ulrich Siegmund	AfD	14,892	48.96	CDU	7,305	24.02	24.94
Jerichower Land	6	Burg	Jan Scharfenort	AfD	14,112	42.59	CDU	7,013	21.16	21.43
Börde	7	Haldensleben	Dirk Lassowski	AfD	14,718	45.39	CDU	9,598	29.60	15.79
Börde	8	Wolmirstedt	Felix Zietmann	AfD	16,009	45.29	CDU	8,860	25.07	20.22
Börde	9	Oschersleben-Wanzleben	Thomas Schmirander	AfD	15,517	49.07	CDU	7,620	24.10	24.97
Magdeburg	10	Magdeburg I	Oliver Kirchner	AfD	11,163	39.38	CDU	6,506	22.95	16.43
Magdeburg	11	Magdeburg II	Mustafa Groener	Left	11,430	29.37	AfD	9,121	23.44	5.93
Magdeburg	12	Magdeburg III	Christian Mertens	AfD	11,712	35.17	CDU	10,547	31.67	3.50
Magdeburg	13	Magdeburg IV	Ronny Kumpf	AfD	13,483	35.58	CDU	10,552	27.85	7.73
Harz	14	Halberstadt	Christian Ulrich Hecht	AfD	12,718	44.54	CDU	6,683	23.40	21.14
Harz	15	Blankenburg	Armin Friese	AfD	12,995	42.21	CDU	6,329	20.56	21.65
Harz	16	Wernigerode	Frank-Ronald Bischoff	AfD	11,717	37.95	CDU	6,632	21.48	16.47
Harz	17	Quedlinburg	Dennis Möhring	AfD	16,483	45.22	CDU	8,029	22.03	23.19
Salzlandkreis	18	Aschersleben	Daniel Rausch	AfD	13,014	47.76	CDU	5,269	19.34	28.42
Salzlandkreis	19	Staßfurt	Matthias Büttner	AfD	13,471	53.43	CDU	6,444	25.56	27.87
Salzlandkreis	20	Schönebeck	Tobias Rausch	AfD	15,859	48.22	CDU	7,575	23.03	25.19
Salzlandkreis	21	Bernburg	Jan Dr. Moldenhauer	AfD	17,463	52.26	CDU	7,482	22.39	29.87
Anhalt-Bitterfeld	22	Köthen	Volker Olenicak	AfD	18,428	50.24	CDU	9,302	25.36	24.88
Anhalt-Bitterfeld	23	Zerbst	Phillipp-Anders Rau	AfD	14,138	48.12	CDU	7,731	26.31	21.81
Landkreis Wittenberg	24	Wittenberg	Andreas Best	AfD	14,353	42.96	CDU	9,829	29.42	13.54
Landkreis Wittenberg	25	Jessen	Matthias Lieschke	AfD	15,630	49.85	CDU	7,866	25.09	24.76
Dessau-Roßlau	26	Dessau-Roßlau	Burkhardt Ratzmann	AfD	12,189	40.80	CDU	8,853	29.63	11.17
Dessau-Roßlau	27	Dessau-Roßlau-Wittenberg	Nadine Koppehel	AfD	13,171	45.39	CDU	7,799	26.88	18.51
Anhalt-Bitterfeld	28	Bitterfeld-Wolfen	Daniel Roi	AfD	18,803	50.91	CDU	7,746	20.97	29.94
Saalekreis	29	Saalekreis	Florian Schröder	AfD	17,546	50.84	CDU	9,218	26.71	24.13
Mansfeld-Südharz	30	Eisleben	Reiner Kretschmann	AfD	18,374	55.63	CDU	7,066	21.39	34.24
Mansfeld-Südharz	31	Sangerhausen	Andreas Gehlmann	AfD	16,357	51.38	CDU	8,151	25.61	25.77
Saalekreis	32	Querfurt	Hans-Thomas Dr. Tillschneider	AfD	18,617	54.85	CDU	7,483	22.05	32.80
Saalekreis	33	Merseburg	Daniel Wald	AfD	14,315	51.23	CDU	7,209	25.80	25.43
Saalekreis	34	Bad Dürrenberg-Saalekreis	Gordon Köhler	AfD	17,129	49.37	CDU	8,389	24.18	25.19
Halle (Saale)	35	Halle I	Alexander Raue	AfD	10,658	43.01	CDU	5,964	24.06	18.95
Halle (Saale)	36	Halle II	Gitta Susann Hartenstein-Wiermann	Left	10,716	29.58	AfD	9,018	24.89	4.69
Halle (Saale)	37	Halle III	Jannik-Loris Balint	Left	16,086	39.90	AfD	7,181	17.81	22.09
Halle (Saale)	38	Halle IV	Paul Backmund	AfD	13,278	41.64	CDU	7,373	23.12	18.52
Burgenlandkreis	39	Weißenfels	Dirk Jonas	AfD	16,659	53.35	CDU	7,113	22.78	30.57
Burgenlandkreis	40	Naumburg	Juliane Waehler	AfD	16,282	47.58	CDU	10,020	29.28	18.30
Burgenlandkreis	41	Zeitz	Lothar Waehler	AfD	16,855	53.08	CDU	6,201	19.53	33.55

== Aftermath ==
=== Analysis ===
==== Result ====
The result was widely regarded as a breakthrough for the AfD, which won 43.8% of the vote, more than twice its share in the 2021 election, and higher than its share in the 2024 Thuringian state election, marking the first time that a far-right party has been on the cusp of power in a German state since World War II. The composition of the new AfD parliamentary group also attracted scrutiny, with several newly elected MPs having controversial backgrounds, including a former Stasi officer, a member who had participated in pornography films, and MPs linked to neo-Nazis and other far-right extremist networks.

Compared to 2021, when the AfD candidates won only one single-member constituency, this time the party won 38 of the 41 constituencies, with no need for overhang seats, while the Left won the remaining three. By contrast, the CDU suffered a landslide defeat. After having won 40 of 41 constituencies in 2021 with a vote share of 37.1%, which resulted in 40 directly elected CDU members and parliament size enlarged to 97, they did not win a single constituency in 2026 and—as parliament size remained at the regular 83 seats due to AfD winning over 43%—only won 15 seats via the party list, losing 62.5% of their MPs. The CDU's popular vote share fell to 17.2%, its weakest result in the state in decades.

The state's other parties saw mixed results. Compared to 2021, voter share increased for the SPD (8.4% to 9.3%) and the Greens (5.9% to 8.9%). Each party won eight seats. This was a slight loss of representation for the SPD but a gain for the Greens, who saw their greatest ever share of the vote in a Saxony-Anhalt election. The Left also won eight seats, declining from 11.0% of the vote in 2021 to 8.6% in 2026. The BSW, which had split from the left since 2021, won 5.3% of the vote and five seats in its first Saxony-Anhalt state election. The FDP's share fell sharply from 6.4% to 2.6%, thus failing to reach the 5% threshold required for representation in the Landtag.

The Konrad Adenauer Foundation identified a generally pessimistic assessment of the economic situation and the future, as well as material and identity-related concerns, as important characteristics of the AfD's support base. The election showed a high degree of electoral volatility. The AfD benefited disproportionately from the sharp increase in turnout to 77.8%, mobilising an estimated 170,000 voters who had not voted in the previous election. Voter-transfer estimates indicated that the AfD's gains came from several parties, as well as from the previous non-voter pool, rather than from a single source. The result was also widely interpreted as a protest against the federal government rather than solely as an endorsement of the AfD. In Saxony-Anhalt, 87% of voters said they were dissatisfied with the federal government, while economist Marcel Fratzscher described the election primarily as a vote of no confidence in it, highlighting the role of dissatisfaction with the government alongside support for the AfD. The election nevertheless had significance beyond the state itself, as AfD candidate Ulrich Siegmund presented the victory as a first step towards national power in 2029, while the result was welcomed by far-right movements elsewhere in Europe and viewed as part of a broader right-wing nationalist trend.

According to polling organisation Konrad Adenauer Stiftung, 33% of Protestants and 34% of Catholics voted for the AfD. This was an increase from 2021 Saxony-Anhalt state election in which only 19% of Protestants and 15% of Catholics voted for the AfD in that election.

==== Tactical voting ====
Tactical voting played a role in the election result. Candidates of the Left won three constituencies in the first vote or candidate vote category in the cities of Magdeburg (II, Nr. 11) and Halle (II Nr. 36, III Nr. 37). The latter constituency, Landtagswahlkreis Halle III (de), was won by the Greens in the second vote with 33.7% over 13.8% for the Left and 13.4% for the SPD, while in the candidate vote Jannik Balint of the Left won 39.9% as the candidates of the SPD and the Greens only won 7.1% and 12.2%. In this constituency with 40,584 active voters, the AfD and the CDU won around 18% and 11%, while the three leftist parties won combined 59.2% and 60.9%, being an example of tactical voting that was recommended by one of the campaigns, with votes redistributed to maximize effect.

According to the Centre for Eastern Studies, some opponents of the AfD, including CDU supporters, voted for the SPD or the Greens in order to help them clear the 5% electoral threshold and thereby reduce the AfD's chances of securing an absolute majority. According to voter-transfer analysis cited by the Centre for Eastern Studies, the SPD and the Greens respectively received an estimated 19,000 and 18,000 votes from CDU voters. The Heinrich Böll Foundation likewise assessed that the initiatives promoting tactical voting contributed substantially to the SPD and the Greens remaining in the Landtag, thereby preventing the AfD from obtaining an absolute majority.

The tactical-voting campaign was particularly significant because the electoral threshold made the parliamentary arithmetic highly sensitive to the performance of smaller parties. The strategy succeeded in preventing an AfD absolute majority, although it did not determine which parties would ultimately be able to form a government. The unexpectedly strong result for the Greens was attributed in part to tactical voters, particularly former CDU voters, while the party also benefited from the mobilisation of previous non-voters. The Left also experienced tactical vote transfers, with its leadership acknowledging that some of its second votes went to the SPD and the Greens as part of efforts to prevent an AfD majority.

==== Firewall policy ====
Despite its historic result, the AfD did not obtain an absolute majority, and therefore could not form a government on its own. The result consequently left the AfD as the largest parliamentary force while the other parties faced the question of whether and how to form a majority without cooperation with it. As a result, the outcome was characterised by a combination of unprecedented electoral support for the AfD and continued political barriers to an AfD-led government. The result intensified debate over Germany's political firewall against the AfD. The scale of the AfD's victory placed particular pressure on the established refusal of mainstream parties to cooperate with it, while the BSW's entry into the Landtag created a potential route to an AfD-led majority and raised the possibility of cooperation across the traditional political divide.

The election sparked a debate over whether maintaining the political firewall remained preferable to allowing the AfD, as the largest parliamentary force, a path into government in Saxony-Anhalt, where governing would expose the party to the practical responsibilities and consequences of implementing its programme. The question was not only whether the AfD could enter government, but also whether governing could put its electoral strength to a practical test. Siegmund presented himself as a more approachable figure than some other AfD politicians while maintaining the party's core positions, and political scientist Wolfgang Merkel noted that whether he could govern remained unproven. An AfD-led government would therefore expose the party to the practical constraints and consequences of implementing its programme, rather than allowing it to remain primarily in opposition.

At the same time, the assumption that excluding the AfD is necessarily more effective than allowing it to govern remained contested as the election raised a broader strategic question: whether continued exclusion could contain the AfD, or whether allowing it to assume governing responsibility would instead expose the limits of its programme and potentially alter its support. Some analysts argued that the political firewall had not prevented the normalisation of far-right positions, while others continued to regard cooperation with the AfD as unacceptable given its extremist classification and political programme.

The immediate alternatives were consequently more complex than a simple choice between an AfD government and its exclusion. The CDU, the SPD, the Greens, and the Left continued to reject governing with the AfD, while the BSW's five seats gave it a potentially decisive role and opened discussion of forms of cooperation that stopped short of a conventional coalition. This left the post-election debate centred not only on whether the firewall should hold, but also on what form of government could replace it, and on whether the AfD should be allowed to assume executive responsibility despite lacking an outright majority.

=== Merz government crisis ===
The result intensified a national leadership crisis around Chancellor Friedrich Merz, whose CDU had governed Saxony-Anhalt since 2002 and whose personal unpopularity was widely cited as a factor in the defeat, including by himself. On 7 October, Merz called on the SPD and Greens to "live up to their responsibilities" and use their negative majority to prevent a Left-led government in Berlin by joining the CDU. As a result, Merz faced controversy and renewed pressure, including by the SPD, over the CDU's position towards the AfD and the possibility that some of its members in Saxony-Anhalt may have voted with the AfD. The crisis prompted a rare intervention from former Chancellor Angela Merkel. In a mid-October 2026 interview with Hessischer Rundfunk, Merkel drew a sharp distinction between The Left and the AfD regarding their adherence to the German Constitution. While she noted that she could not share the views of certain members of The Left, "particularly when it comes to antisemitism", she stated that their views were "by and large, not contrary to our constitution", adding that she would have been open to a compromise with The Left while maintaining that mainstream parties should not cooperate with the AfD.

== Government formation ==
=== Possible coalitions ===
Siegmund had expressed prior to the election that he would only run for Minister-President should the AfD receive an absolute majority in the vote. With this target missed by three seats, neither the AfD nor a hypothetical coalition of the CDU, the SPD, the Greens, and the Left, all of whom have a firewall policy against the far-right, have enough seats for a majority, with both at 39 seats. Furthermore, Sven Schulze seemingly ruled out a coalition with any party, claiming that the CDU did not have a mandate to govern following its historic defeat and that the party would "sit in the opposition".

Shortly after the election, Siegmund said that he was ready to enter into agreements with other parties or individual MPs in order to form a cabinet, but that he would not compromise on the issues raised in the party manifesto; he has signalled that he will not run for Minister-President unless he can count on a stable enough majority. The BSW had ruled out a formal coalition with the AfD before the election and again on election night; Claudia Wittig repeated on 7 September that her party would not enter one. It nevertheless said it would talk to the AfD about individual projects and changing majorities. BSW founder Sahra Wagenknecht invited the AfD into talks on a nonpartisan Minister-President, a proposal that was rejected by the AfD. Siegmund described it as a "messy muddle", while AfD federal leader Tino Chrupalla made clear that the party would only support Siegmund as Minister-President.

The election of the Minister-President is governed by article 65 of the state constitution. All parties may nominate a candidate, and any candidate receiving an absolute majority of votes is elected. If no one is elected in the first round, a second round also requiring an absolute majority must take place within seven days. If no one is elected in the second round, the Landtag is given fourteen more days to vote whether to dissolve itself and hold a snap election. If the vote on dissolution fails, a third Minister-President ballot must be held immediately, and the candidate receiving the plurality of votes is elected.

The BSW announced that—in the absence of an agreement—it would abstain on the third vote to elect the Minister-President; however, since the CDU, SPD, the Greens, and the Left combined have 39 votes just like the AfD, even this may not easily break the impasse. On the other hand, it has been suggested that some of the CDU members could break ranks and vote for Siegmund in spite of the traditional anti-AfD firewall. The AfD invited all other parties to non-binding exploratory talks from 8 September, but all except the BSW quickly declined them. The possibility of defections from the CDU to the AfD became a subject of speculation. On 11 September, Siegmund confirmed that talks with politicians from other parties had taken place, while stating that the party was considering potential defectors. MDR subsequently surveyed the 15 newly elected CDU members of the Landtag; all of them explicitly ruled out switching to the AfD.

A significant point of discussion between the AfD and the BSW was on whether to allow the proposed establishment of an Israeli-based Elbit Systems weapons' factory in Sangerhausen. The BSW was opposed to it due to the company's involvement in the Gaza war, while Siegmund supported it. The dispute between the two parties (exacerbated by the BSW's continued refusal to support Siegmund as Minister-President) eventually devolved into a public spat. Oliver Kirchner (head of the AfD parliamentary group in the Landtag) claimed that it was difficult for the AfD to cooperate with a party led "by a woman named Mohamed Ali and by this half-Italian" (BSW co-leaders Amira Mohamed Ali and Fabio De Masi). In response, Wagenknecht called out the AfD leadership as being "very weird individuals" unsuited to govern; however, neither party halted negotiations, which proceeded as scheduled.

Parallel to this, the SPD leadership invited all parties besides the AfD to a meeting to begin exploratory talks toward forming a government under a non-partisan Minister-President. The CDU declined the invitation, with the state executive holding to its post-election decision to go into opposition. The BSW left open whether it would participate and criticized the exclusion of the AfD, but welcomed the proposal of an independent Minister-President.

=== Minister-President election ===
On 29 September, Siegmund told the press he would put himself forward as a Minister-President candidate in December; he claimed to be in "constructive talks with another parliamentary group and individual members of other groups" about supporting him. Before the Landtag's opening session, Siegmund told the body he would only stand in the first ballot of election, and asserted again he would receive a majority on that first ballot. He left open what action he would take if that did not happen but did not rule out voting for a snap election.

The opening session of the Landtag was held on 6 October. The AfD, as the largest party, had the exclusive nomination for president of the Landtag and proposed Tobias Rausch for the role. The BSW had announced they would support Rausch, which meant the latter was expected to get 44 votes (39 from the AfD and 5 from the BSW). CDU state leadership recommended its members abstain, while all the other parties opposed Rausch's candidacy. Rausch unexpectedly received 48 votes in favour, 29 against, and 5 abstentions out of 82 members present. This indicated that at least four members of other parliamentary groups voted for him; media reports suggested that these included CDU deputies, although as the election is by secret ballot any claims cannot be verified.

As this is the first time an AfD member has been elected president of a state parliament, the election prompted strong criticism from federal SPD politicians. Defence Minister Boris Pistorius described it as an "unprecedented breach of taboo" in parliamentary democracy and said that democratic politicians had acted as "stepping stones" for right-wing extremists. After the previous state election where the AfD was returned as the largest party (Thuringia in 2024), a cross-party majority was able to block the AfD's candidate.

It was agreed to that up to three vice-presidents of the Landtag were to be elected in three ballots. More than one candidate can be proposed on any of the ballots, and the candidate with the plurality of votes (or a plurality of yes votes in case of one candidate) is elected. The AfD and the BSW voted for an amendment to the standing orders allowing the group holding the presidency to also hold a vice presidency, reversing the previous rule to the contrary. The AfD then put forward Hans-Thomas Tillschneider as its candidate for vice-president; the SPD and CDU purposely withdrew their candidates to force an up-or-down vote on him. Although all other parties aside from the AfD had claimed they would vote against him, Tillschneider was nonetheless elected with 44 votes in favor and 38 against. Schulze asserted that the CDU group was unanimously against him and did not provide the majority votes.

On the second ballot was Carsten Borchert of the CDU, who received 64 yes votes, 17 no votes and one abstention; the SPD and Left withdrew their candidates to ensure his election. Willingmann was proposed as the third candidate and failed with 33 yes votes, 48 no votes, and one invalid vote, thus leaving the Landtag with two vice-presidents. Referring to the defections in favour of Rausch, Wagenknecht told Stern that "the election of Ulrich Siegmund as Minister-President has become probable today."

On 7 October, Rausch told the Deutsche Presse-Agentur that four CDU members had agreed to vote for Siegmund as Minister-President, and that he had also been elected President of the Landtag with CDU votes. Rausch said he was waiting for the CDU state party convention – set for 5 December shortly before the proposed Minister-President election – and declined to elaborate further. When it came to who provided the majority votes for Tillschneider, who is seen as an extremist, both the CDU and BSW accused each other. Federal leaders of the other parties demanded an explanation from CDU leadership, and deputy CDU leader Karin Prien called the allegation "completely unacceptable" if true.

On 13 October, Schulze announced to the Landtag that the CDU group voted to walk out of the parliamentary chamber during the Minister-President election, to prove there are no defections to Siegmund from their ranks. The vote was 14–0 with one abstention. This came after increasing pressure on the group: Bavarian Minister-President and CSU leader Markus Söder publicly demanded any members who voted for Rausch resign, and Die Tageszeitung reported that eight CDU members had told it they abstained when there were only five abstentions. The following week, former group leader Guido Heuer – who was the abstention on the vote to leave the chamber – stated in an interview with Nius that he would not do so because it would compromise ballot secrecy. He also called for a "policy of red lines" toward the AfD instead of a complete firewall and did not rule out voting with an AfD government on individual legislation, though stopped short of supporting a coalition or toleration of a minority government.

The Left announced on 10 November that it would nominate von Angern as a Minister-President candidate. This was heavily criticized by the other parties who saw it as potentially sealing Siegmund's election; SPD parliamentary group leader Katja Pähle called it a "political ego trip" and Wittig joked in consideration of The Left's 8.6% of the vote that "at the very least it is an ambitious contribution to the realm of political entertainment." SPD and Green leadership repeated their call on the other non-AfD parties begin discussions to find a common, nonpartisan Minister-President candidate.

== Reactions ==
=== National reactions ===
Chancellor Merz stated that the election result "has changed not only Saxony-Anhalt, but Germany as a whole", and added: "We are all profoundly shocked." Merz's CDU placed second under the leadership of the outgoing Minister-President Sven Schulze, who stated he would draw lessons from the result. Former Chancellor Merkel described the election's outcome as "simply shocking" and a "turning point" in German history, stating as a member of the CDU that her "heart bleeds" over the results. Public reactions in Saxony-Anhalt were sharply divided. While some voters expressed shock and concern about the implications for immigrants and the state's future, AfD supporters described the result as an opportunity for the party to implement its programme and "straighten up" the state.

=== International reactions ===
Reaction to the result was relatively split across the ideological spectrum. In France, ministers of the second Lecornu government expressed concerns. Presidential candidate Jean-Luc Mélenchon of La France Insoumise stated following the election results that "under these conditions, the German military project to create the first conventional army in Europe is unacceptable to France." Fellow party member Hadrien Clouet similarly called the German rearmament and AfD win a "dubious combination", and said that the AfD is a neo-Nazi party.

Polish Prime Minister and former President of the European Council Donald Tusk said on X (formerly Twitter) that "only idiots and traitors can rejoice at the triumph of the AfD". Former Polish Prime Minister Mateusz Morawiecki said he considered the AfD a "threat" to Poland, adding that he is "not at all pleased when Germany boasts about its growing military spending and the growing strength of the German army", and that he "would prefer the Polish army to be stronger". Similarly, speaking for France's National Rally, which had broken ties with the AfD following comments on the Nazi era by the AfD's lead candidate in the 2024 European Parliament election in Germany, the National Assembly member Jean-Philippe Tanguy said he was "scandalised" regarding the AfD win as voters elected a party that "downplay[s] Germany's Nazi past". Tanguy added that he left a meeting with AfD politicians in 2019 "terrorised".

Belgian Defence Minister Theo Francken placed the blame of the results on former Chancellor Merkel's "Wir schaffen das" policy in the 2015 European migrant crisis, calling her leadership "weak" and her legacy "dramatic". Leaders of other European right-wing populist parties, such as Hungary's Viktor Orbán and László Toroczkai, Italy's Matteo Salvini, and Spain's Santiago Abascal, welcomed the result, with the latter stating it represented "a great hope for Germany and Europe". US President Donald Trump likewise praised the AfD for its electoral victory and political stances, which led Chancellor Merz to cancel a planned phone call with Trump. American businessman Elon Musk, who is the owner of X and CEO of Tesla, hailed the results, with Siegmund personally thanking him for his support.

== See also ==
- 2026 Berlin state election
- 2026 Mecklenburg-Vorpommern state election
