= Claudia Wittig =

German historian and politician

- Wittig in 2026

Member of the Landtag of Saxony-Anhalt
- Incumbent
- Assumed office 2026

Personal details
- Born: 1983 (age 42–43) Lutherstadt Wittenberg, East Germany
- Party: Sahra Wagenknecht Alliance (since 2023)
- Other political affiliations: Die Linke (until 2023)
- Education: University of Greifswald; Martin Luther University Halle-Wittenberg

Claudia Wittig (born 1983) is a German historian and politician. She was elected to the Landtag of Saxony-Anhalt as a co-lead candidate in the 2026 Saxony-Anhalt state election.

== Biography ==
Wittig studied history at the University of Greifswald and received her doctorate in medieval and modern history. She worked, among other things, as a research assistant at the Martin Luther University of Halle-Wittenberg.

Between 2018 and 2023, she was a member of Die Linke. She left the party in 2023 following criticism of the neglect of "central issues" and became a member of the Sahra Wagenknecht Alliance (BSW) in 2024, where she is part of the party's federal executive committee.

In March 2026, she was elected at a state party conference, together with Thomas Schulze, as co-lead candidate of the BSW Saxony-Anhalt for the 2026 Saxony-Anhalt state election.

== Political positions ==
Wittig opposes a so-called "firewall" against the AfD and advocates for substantive and targeted cooperation on specific issues (such as energy and media policy). She said, discussions so far with AfD were constructive. However, she rejects a formal coalition or the election of the AfD's lead candidate, Ulrich Siegmund, as Minister-President.

During the 2026 election campaign, Wittig wore a lapel pin with a watermelon motif, a symbol of the pro-Palestinian movement, during several television appearances.

== See also ==
- List of Sahra Wagenknecht Alliance politicians
