= Thomas Schulze =

German politician

Member of the Landtag of Saxony-Anhalt
- Incumbent
- Assumed office 2026

Personal details
- Born: 1964 (age 61–62) Merseburg, Germany
- Party: Sahra Wagenknecht Alliance

Thomas Schulze (born 1964) is a German civil servant, restaurateur and politician. He is, alongside John Lucas Dittrich, the co-chairman of the BSW Saxony-Anhalt. He was elected to the Landtag of Saxony-Anhalt as a co-lead candidate in the 2026 Saxony-Anhalt state election.

== Biography ==
Thomas Schulze began his career as a cook and restaurant manager in East Germany and ran an integration restaurant for people with mental disabilities in Berlin. Later, he worked in a family-owned hotel and restaurant business in Rhineland-Palatinate.

In 1996, he transferred to the correctional service there, completed his civil service training, and worked in the medical service until 2002. After moving to Saxony-Anhalt, he held various administrative positions in the correctional system, most recently as head of the administrative office at Burg Prison. Since 2024, he has worked at the administrative office of the Saxony-Anhalt State Reception Center (LAE) in Stendal. Schulze was active as a youth football coach for many years and was a member of the DFB youth advisory board.

In 2024 he joined the Sahra Wagenknecht Alliance (BSW) and in March 2026, at a state party conference, he was elected, together with Claudia Wittig, as the BSW's co-lead candidate for Saxony-Anhalt in the 2026 Saxony-Anhalt state election.

== Political positions ==
Schulze opposes a so-called "firewall" against the AfD and advocates for substantive and targeted cooperation on specific issues (such as energy and media policy). However, he rejects a formal coalition or the election of the AfD's lead candidate, Ulrich Siegmund, as Minister-President.

He has called for the resumption of Russian gas deliveries and accuses the other parties of hypocrisy, of doing business with the US under Donald Trump while sanctioning Russia.

== See also ==
- List of Sahra Wagenknecht Alliance politicians
