= Schütze (surname) =

Schütze is a surname of German origin.

== People with the surname ==
- Christina Schütze (born 1983), German hockey player
- Erich Schütze, German veteran
- Eva Watson-Schütze (1867–1935), American photographer
- Frank Schütze (born 1956), German rower
- Johann Friedrich Schütze (1758–1810), German author
- Johann Wilhelm Schütze (1807–1878), German painter
- Jürgen Schütze (1951–2000), East German racing cyclist
- Karl Traugott Schütze (1858–1938), German-Wendish teacher and naturalist
- Lars Schütze (born 1974), German politician
- Lisa Schütze (born 1996), German hockey player
- Paul Schütze (born 1958), Australian artist
- Viktor Schütze (1906–1950), German veteran

== See also ==
- Schulze
- William H. Schuetze
