= Garden Party (Germany) =

Garden Party Gartenpartei
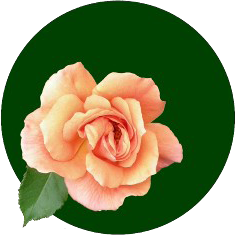
- Abbreviation: Gartenpartei; MG (before 2017)
- Leader: Roland Zander
- Founded: 2013; 13 years ago
- Headquarters: Othrichstraße 7; 39128 Magdeburg
- Membership (2021): 349
- Ideology: Pro-Allotment; Environmentalism
- Colors: Dark Green
- Magdeburg city council: 2 / 56

Website
- www.gartenpartei.eu

The Garden Party (German: Gartenpartei), until 2017 known as the Magdeburg Garden Party (German: Magdeburger Gartenpartei, MG), is a minor political party in Germany that is primarily active in the city of Magdeburg. It was founded by allotment owners in 2013 who were opposed to development plans by the city that would have led to eviction of their allotments. The party has been represented on Magdeburg city council since 2014.

== Organization ==
The Garden Party in the Magdeburg city council formed a faction together with the Tierschutzallianz.

Though officially a separate political party, the Garden Party of Frankfurt am Main (Gartenpartei Ffm), founded in 2019, de facto acts as a local brauch of the Garden Party, both parties working closely together. Gartenpartei Ffm participated in Frankfurt local elections, with its lead candidate Tilo Schwichtenberg, in 2021, 2023 and 2026 respectively.

== Election results ==
The Garden Party was not able to participate in the 2019 European Parliament election in Germany due to not submitting documents in time.

=== Federal Parliament (Bundestag) ===
Election	Party list		Constituency	
Election	Votes	%	Votes	%
2017	5,617	0.01	2,570	0.01
2021	7,611	0.02	2,095	0.00

=== State parliaments (Landtage) ===
Election	Saxony-Anhalt			
Election	Party list		Constituency	
Election	Votes	%	Votes	%
2016	4,763	0.42	2,412	0.22
2021	8,583	0.81	3,216	0.30
2026	7,482	0.57	2,937	0.22

=== Local election ===
City council elections
Election	Magdeburg			Frankfurt		
Election	Votes	%	Seats	Votes	%	Seats
2014	4,162	1.9	1			
2019	12,709	4.2	2			
2021				68,820	0.6	0
2024	14,711	4.6	3			
2026				30.597	0.2	0

Mayoral elections
Election	Frankfurt				
Election	Candidate	First round		Second round	
Election	Candidate	Votes	%	Votes	%
2023	Tilo Schwichtenberg	661	0.3		

== See also ==
- Allotment (gardening)
- Alliance for Human Rights, Animal- and Nature Protection
- Alliance 90/The Greens
- Human Environment Animal Protection Party
