= Paul Wesley Schultz =

Environmental Psychologist

Paul Wesley Schultz Ph.D
- Born: Paul Wesley Schultz; Riverside, California
- Education: University of California, Irvine (BA); University of Maine (MA); Claremont Graduate School (PhD)
- Occupations: Professor, editor-in-chief
- Known for: Environmental psychology, social psychology, social norms, environmental conservation, connectedness with nature, boomerang effect
- Scientific career
- Fields: Environmental psychology, social psychology, conservation
- Academic advisors: Stuart Oskamp
- Website: research.cgu.edu/change-lab/

Paul Wesley Schultz is an American author, academic, and researcher. He is widely cited for his research on social norms, conservation behavior, and connectedness with nature. He is a Full Research Professor of Psychology at the Claremont Graduate University (CGU) in Claremont, California, directing the Change Lab with Anna Woodcock. He previously served as the dean of graduate studies and professor of psychology at California State University, San Marcos (CSUSM). Schultz is co-editor-in-chief of the Journal of Environmental Psychology.

== Education ==
Schultz began his academic journey at the University of California, Irvine, where he earned a B.A. in psychology in 1990. Following the recommendation of his academic advisor, Shawn Rosenberg, Schultz furthered his education at the University of Maine, where he studied green politics and obtained a psychology M.A. in 1992. He then continued his graduate studies at the Claremont Graduate School (now Claremont Graduate University), where he studied under the supervision of Stuart Oskamp, one of the few scholars working on the psychology of environmental conservation at the time. During graduate school, Schultz conducted field research on recycling and energy conservation. In 1995, he received his Ph.D. in psychology and statistics from the Claremont Graduate School.

== Academic career ==
Currently, Schultz is a full research professor at the Claremont Graduate University. Prior to joining CGU, he served as the dean of graduate studies and professor of psychology at California State University San Marcos. Between 1995 and 1997, he was a visiting assistant professor at St. Lawrence University in New York.

Since 2020, Schultz has been co-editor-in-chief for the Journal of Environmental Psychology, alongside Lindsay McCunn. He also serves on the editorial boards of Frontiers in Psychology, Environment and Behavior, Human Ecology Review, and the CSU Journal of Sustainability and Climate Change.

== Publications ==
Schultz is the author or editor of several books in areas of social and environmental psychology and conservation behavior.

Aside from his books, Schultz has also published more than 100 peer-reviewed journal articles on social norms, environmental behavior and connectedness to nature.

== Professional service ==
For more than 15 years, Schultz has served as an advisor to Stanford University’s Behavior, Energy, and Climate Change (BECC) initiative. He previously served for more than a decade on the board of directors Keep America Beautiful. As a scientific advisor, he currently consults with Badger Meter International and he previously advised the U.S. Environmental Protection Agency’s ENERGY STAR program. He was elected president of the International Association of Applied Psychology Division of Environmental Psychology, where he served 12 years as a president-elect, president, and former president.

== Awards ==
Schultz was awarded the Outstanding Dissertation Award by the Claremont Graduate School in 1995 for his research on recycling intervention and was a recipient of CSUSM's Psi Chi 2007 Distinguished Professor award. In total, Schultz has received approximately $14 million in grants over his academic career.
