= Paul Schulze (disambiguation) =

Paul Schulze (born 1962) is an American actor.

Paul Schulze may also refer to:

- Paul Schulze (architect) (1827/28–1897), German-born architect who practised in Boston, Massachusetts; see Boylston Hall
- Paul Schulze (cyclist) (1882–1918), German cyclist who competed at the 1908 Summer Olympics
- Paul Schulze (zoologist) (1887–1949), German amateur taxonomist who specialised in ticks
- Paul Schulze (officer), Wehrmacht soldier who was awarded the Knight's Cross of the Iron Cross in 1943
- Paul Schulze (German politician) (1883–1966), a German National People's Party politician
- Paul Schulze (Ontario politician), independent candidate in the 1985 Ontario provincial election

== See also ==
- Paul Schultze-Naumburg (1869–1949), German architect, painter, publicist and politician
- Paul Schultz (1891–1964), general in the Wehrmacht
- Paul Schulz (1898–1963), German military officer and Nazi Party official
- Paul Schulz (ufologist) (1925–2013), German posadist theorist and ufologist
- Paul Schultz (rugby league) (1940–2024), New Zealand
- Paul Wesley Schultz, American psychologist
