= Oliver Kirchner =

German politician (born 1966)

Member of the Landtag of Saxony-Anhalt
- Incumbent
- Assumed office 12 April 2016
- Preceded by: Hans-Joachim Mewes
- Constituency: Magdeburg I (2016–2021, 2026-)

Personal details
- Born: 4 May 1966 (age 60) Magdeburg
- Party: Alternative for Germany (since 2014)

Oliver Kirchner (born 4 May 1966 in Magdeburg) is a German politician serving as a member of the Landtag of Saxony-Anhalt since 2016. He has served as group leader of the Alternative for Germany and as leader of the opposition since 2018.

In the aftermath of the 2026 Saxony-Anhalt state election Kirchner claimed that it was difficult for the AfD to cooperate with a party (BSW) led "by a woman named Mohamed Ali and by this half-Italian" (BSW co-leaders Amira Mohamed Ali and Fabio De Masi). In response, BSW founder Sarah Wagenknecht called out the AfD leadership as being "very weird individuals" unsuited to govern.
