= Willibald Schulze =

Willibald Schulze was a German writer who belonged to the Nazi Party.

== Work ==
Willibald Schulze praised Pierre-Joseph Proudhon as the Wegweiser, or signpost, of the Third Reich because Proudhon rejected revolutionary socialism, interest capital and parliamentarianism. He asserted that Proudhon's ideas were closer to National Socialism.

== Writings of Schulze ==
- Ottomar Beta: Der Schlüssel zu Goethe's "Faust": (Old Iniquity). Edited by Willibald Schulze, Leipzig 1924.
- "Nicht Eigentum, sondern Besitz!", in Hammer. Blätter für Deutschen Sinn, Vol. XXX, 699/700, August 1931, p. 202-205.
- "Proudhon", in Hammer. Blätter für deutschen Sinn, Vol. XXX, 93/694, Mai 1931, p. 113-120.
- "Volkswirtschaft ohne Geld?", in Hammer. Blätter für deutschen Sinn, Vol. XXX, 701/702, September 1931, p. 229-231.
- Der Weltsinn der Technik. Leipzig: Armanen-Verl., 1935.
- "War Proudhon Anarchist?", Deutschlands Erneuerung, XXIII, (1939), p. 14 - 21.
