= Susan Sziborra-Seidlitz =

German politician (born 1977)

- Sziborra-Seidlitz in 2025

Member of the Landtag of Saxony-Anhalt
- Incumbent
- Assumed office 6 July 2021

Personal details
- Born: 27 September 1977 (age 49) East Berlin, East Germany
- Party: Alliance 90/The Greens

Susan Sziborra-Seidlitz (born 27 September 1977) is a German politician serving as a member of the Landtag of Saxony-Anhalt since 2021. She has served as co-chair of Alliance 90/The Greens in Saxony-Anhalt since 2025, having previously served from 2016 to 2021.
