= Karl Traugott Schütze =

German teacher and entomologist (1858-1938)

- Korla Bohuwěr Šěca
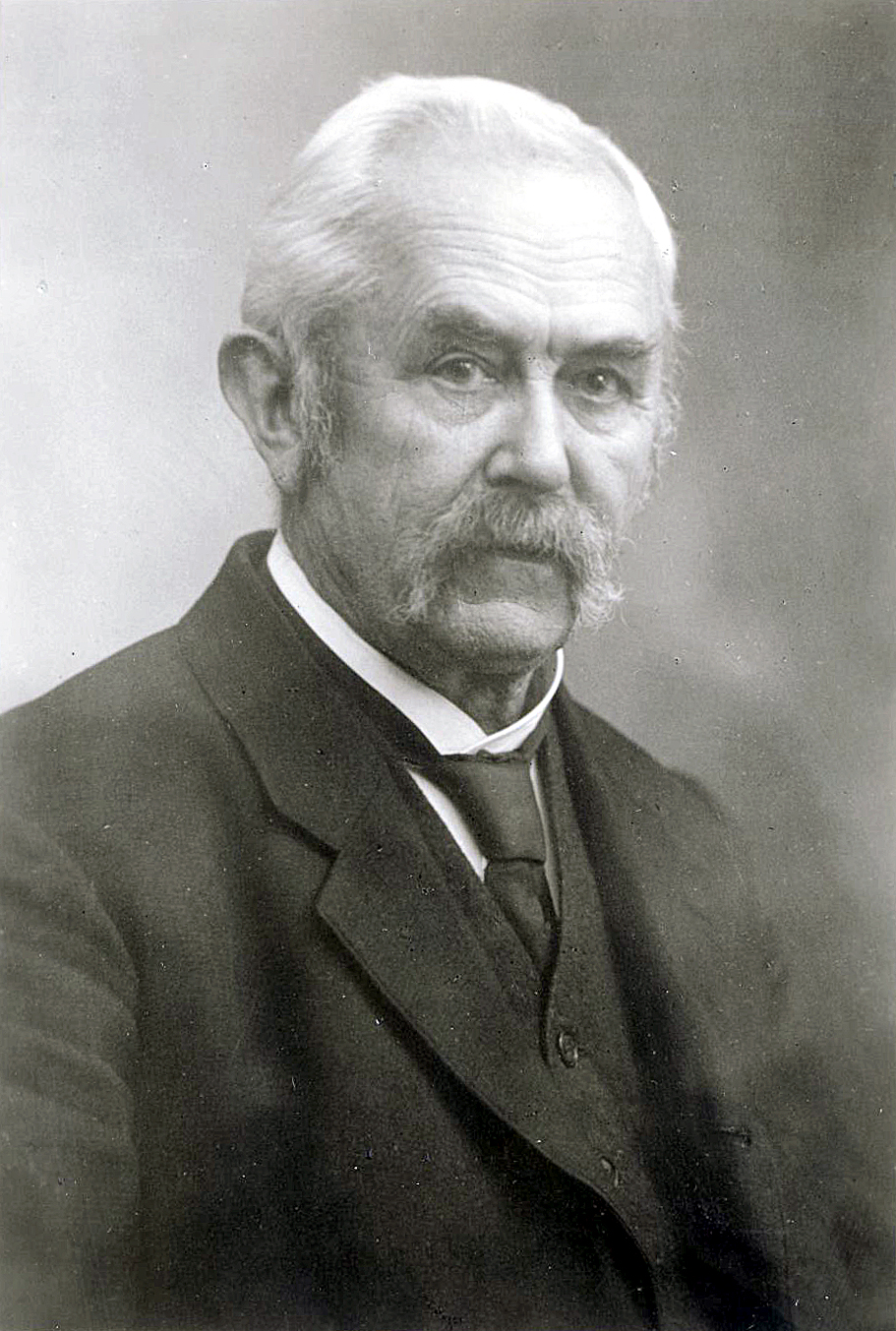
- Born: August 26, 1858; Klix, Kingdom of Saxony, German Confederation
- Died: November 17, 1938 (aged 80)
- Occupation: Teacher
- Spouse: Johanna Emilia Albert (m. 1881)
- Children: 6

Karl Traugott Schütze or Korla Bohuwěr Šěca (26 August 1858 – 17 November 1938) was a German schoolteacher and amateur entomologist of Sorbian descent in the Upper Lusatia region where he studied the microlepidoptera in his spare time.

== Life and work ==
Schütze was born in 1858 in Klix (Upper Sorbian: Klukš), Saxony, where his father was a wheelwright and farmer. He grew up exploring the meadows of the Spree, collecting specimens of crustaceans, fish and insects. He trained as a teacher at the teachers training institute in Bautzen (Budyšin) and became a schoolteacher in Rachlau in 1877. He married Johanna Emilia Albert in 1881 and they had six children. He collected natural history specimens and studied the insects in the Mount Czorneboh (Čornobóh) region. He wrote popular science articles in the Sorbian language and gave public lectures. He retired from teaching in 1920.

Schütze studied the lepidoptera of Upper Lusatia but also examined insects of several other groups including the hymenoptera and diptera (particularly the Tipulidae). He conducted rearing experiments on parasitic hymenoptera as well as silkworms. He corresponded with entomologists in the region including Aristide Caradja in Romania, Karl Escherich in Munich, and Erich Hering in Berlin. In 1931 he published Die Biologie der Kleinschmetterlinge (“The Biology of Small Moths”).

Schütze died in 1938 and was buried at Hochkirch (Bukecy) church cemetery. In 2018, a memorial was erected in the school where he taught.
