= Ulrich Siegmund =

German politician (born 1990)

Ulrich Siegmund MdL
- Siegmund in 2026

Leader of the AfD in the Landtag of Saxony-Anhalt
- Incumbent
- Assumed office 23 August 2023 Serving with Oliver Kirchner
- Preceded by: Position established

Member of the Landtag of Saxony-Anhalt
- Incumbent
- Assumed office 12 April 2016
- Preceded by: Thomas Staudt
- Constituency: AfD list (2016–2026); Genthin (2026–present)

Personal details
- Born: 25 October 1990 (age 36) Havelberg, Saxony-Anhalt, Germany
- Party: Alternative for Germany
- Spouse: Julia Siegmund
- Children: 1
- Education: Europäische Fernhochschule Hamburg

Ulrich Siegmund (born 25 October 1990) is a German politician who has served as co-leader of the Alternative for Germany parliamentary group in the Landtag of Saxony-Anhalt since 2022 and as member of the Landtag of Saxony-Anhalt since 2016. As AfD's lead candidate in the 2026 Saxony-Anhalt state election, he led his party to a landslide victory, doubling its share of the vote and achieving AfD's best result in any German state.

== Early life and education ==
Ulrich Siegmund was born on 25 October 1990 in Havelberg, Saxony-Anhalt, in the newly reunified Germany. As a teenager, he did an apprenticeship in wholesale and foreign-trade specialist, before studying business psychology and business administration at the Europäische Fernhochschule in Hamburg.

== Political career ==
He became a member of the AfD party in the mid 2010s, going on to become a member of the State Landtag in 2016.

In 2022, Oliver Kirchner, chair of the AfD parliamentary group in Saxony-Anhalt, proposed that both of them could be lead candidate and Siegmund began co-chairing the parliamentary group with Kirchner.

On 25 November 2023, Siegmund took part in the 2023 Potsdam far-right meeting. Siegmund was the chair of the Social Affairs Committee in Saxony-Anhalt until February 2024, when the Parliament voted to remove him from the role due to his participation in the meeting.

In 2025, during a state-party conference in Magdeburg, Siegmund was selected by AfD to be their lead candidate after he received 98.3 percent of the votes.

On 13 August 2026, the German weekly news magazine Der Spiegel had a mug-shot-style photograph of him on its cover, labelling him "the most dangerous man in Germany." Siegmund used the magazine cover in his political campaign.

=== 2026 Saxony-Anhalt state election ===
The 2026 Saxony-Anhalt state election was held on 6 September 2026 to elect the 9th Landtag of Saxony-Anhalt. Siegmund was the AfD's lead candidate and its nominee for Minister-President. The AfD obtained 43.8 percent of the second votes (more than double its 20.8 percent result in 2021), finishing first by a wide margin. Projections indicated the AfD would win about 39 of the 83 seats in the Landtag (42 needed for an absolute majority), falling just short of the ability to govern alone. Voter turnout reached a record high of approximately 77 percent (compared with 60.3 percent in 2021).

Siegmund described the result as historic, stating: "We have achieved exactly what we wanted to achieve. We have made history in this state." He indicated willingness to reach out to other parties seeking political change while emphasising that the AfD would not "bend" for power options and had previously conditioned assuming the office of Minister-President on an absolute majority. AfD federal co-leader Alice Weidel called it a "clear mandate to govern".

After and before the election, all other democratic parties denied to work with AfD. BSW was indifferent. The BSW narrowly entered the state parliament with 5.3 percent and considered abstaining during the parliamentary vote for the Minister-President. Siegmund promised, before and after the election, that he would only become Minister-President if elected in the first ballot in the state parliament. His party leader, Alice Weidel, contradicted him: "Ulrich Siegmund will become Minister-President—whether in the first, second, or third round of voting. It doessn´t matter for us."

== Personal life ==
Siegmund is married to Julia Siegmund, a pedagogic employee at Comenius-secondary school inStendal. They have one daughter. The family resides in Tangermünde. Despite ending his membership with the German Catholic Church in 2017, Siegmund has stated that he still considers himself to be a Catholic and that he keeps Catholic values "close to his heart".

Ulrich Siegmunds father, Andreas Siegmund, was employed by the MP of Bundestag Thomas Korell and earned more than 7000 Euro a month, a well-above-average salary. The revelation was part of the uncovering of a network of nepotism within the AfD in Saxony-Anhalt in 2026.
