= Richard Schulze =

Richard Schulze may refer to:

- Richard Schulze-Kossens (1914–1988), German Waffen-SS officer during World War II
- Richard Allen Schulze (1928-2001) a founder of the American Conservatory of Music (Hammond, Indiana & Belize)
- Richard M. Schulze (born 1941), American businessman, founder of Best Buy
- Richard T. Schulze (born 1929), American politician, member of the U.S. Congress representing Pennsylvania
