= Hendrik Lange =

German politician (born 1977)

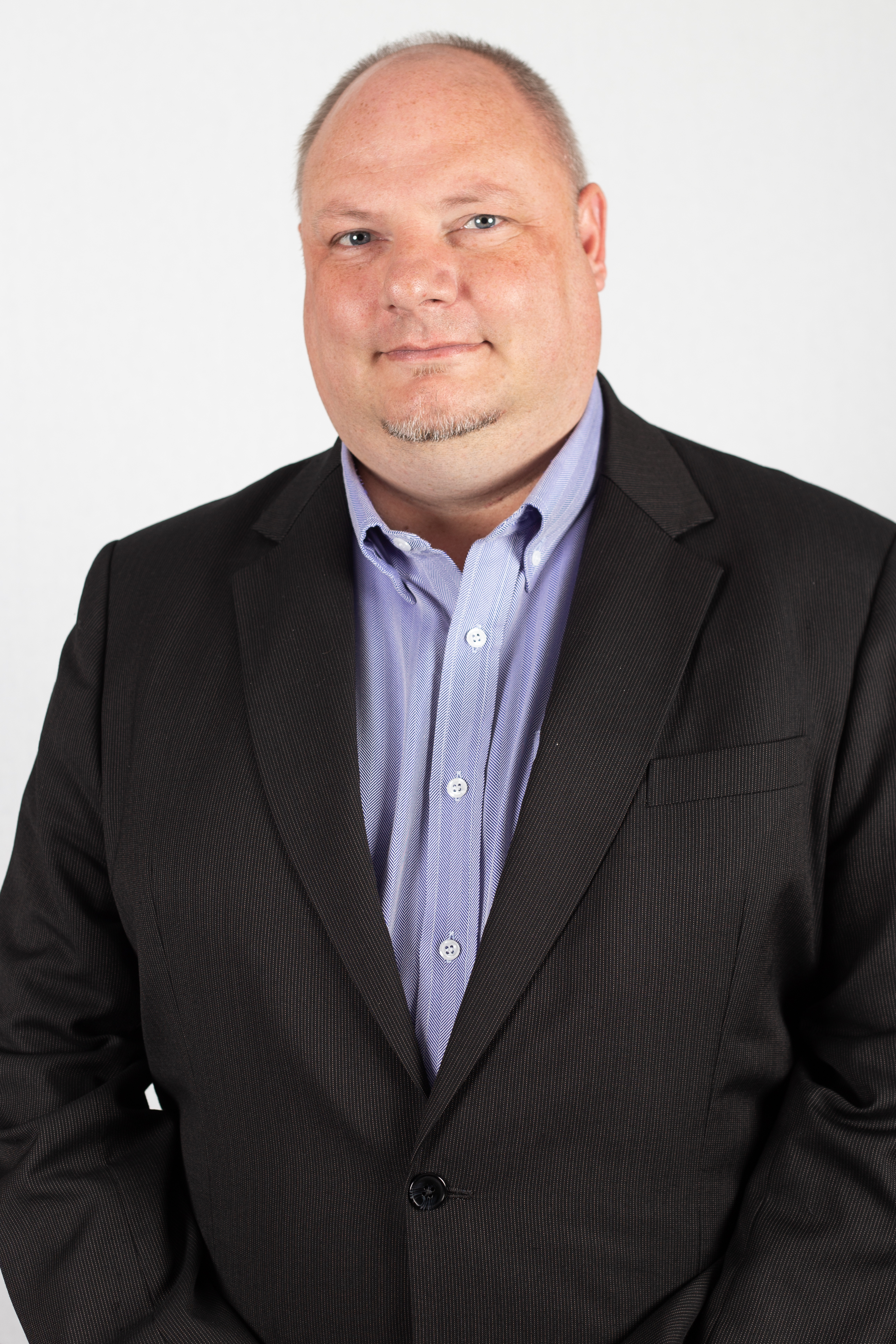
- Lange in 2018

Member of the Landtag of Saxony-Anhalt
- Incumbent
- Assumed office 24 April 2006

Personal details
- Born: 20 January 1977 (age 49)
- Party: Die Linke (since 2007)

Hendrik Lange (born 20 January 1977) is a German politician serving as a member of the Landtag of Saxony-Anhalt since 2006. He has served as co-chairman of Die Linke in Saxony-Anhalt since 2023.
