= John Schulze =

John Schulze may refer to:

- John Andrew Shulze (1774–1852), sixth Governor of Pennsylvania
- John DuCasse Schulze (1876–1943), American art director
- John Schulze (baseball) (1866–1941), Major League Baseball catcher
