= Janina Böttger =

German politician (born 1982)

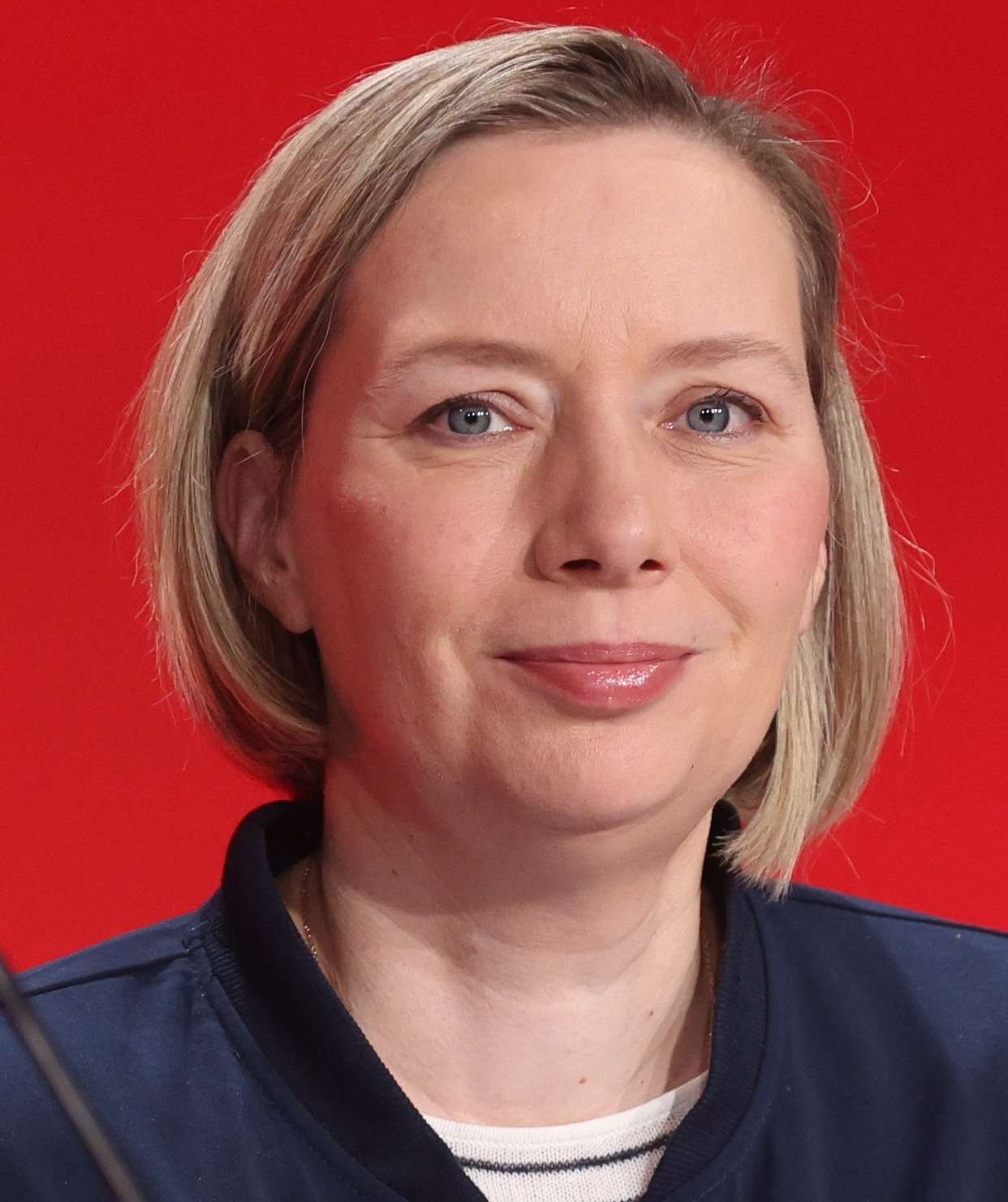
- Böttger in 2025

Member of the Bundestag
- Incumbent
- Assumed office March 2025
- Constituency: Saxony-Anhalt

Personal details
- Born: 1982 (age 43–44) Merseburg
- Party: The Left

Janina Böttger (born April 4, 1982 in Merseburg) is a German politician who was elected as a member of the Bundestag in 2025. She has served as co-chair of The Left in Saxony-Anhalt since 2022.
