= Lindsay McCunn =

Environmental psychologist

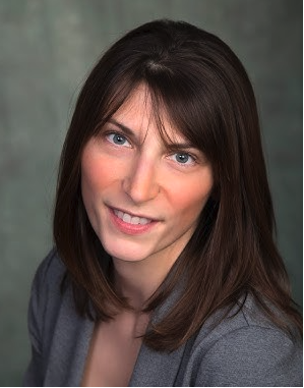
- Born: Lindsay Joyce McCunn; May 17, 1981 (age 45)
- Education: University of Victoria (BA); University of Victoria (MSc); King’s College London (MSc); University of Victoria (PhD)
- Occupations: Professor of Psychology, Environmental Psychologist, Consultant
- Known for: Environmental/architectural psychology, sustainability, user-centered design and evaluation, community planning, interdisciplinary applied research
- Scientific career
- Fields: Environmental psychology, architectural psychology, applied social science, sustainability, urban planning
- Website: drlindsaymccunn.com

Lindsay Joyce McCunn (born May 17, 1981) is a Canadian environmental psychologist and professor of psychology at Vancouver Island University in Nanaimo, British Columbia. She is a Fellow of the Canadian Psychological Association and is known for her work in environmental and architectural psychology, particularly in the areas of sustainability, community planning, and user-centered design. Her research has been cited in interdisciplinary contexts, influencing both academic research and applied practice in planning, architecture, health care, and school administration. She is the co-editor-in-chief of the Journal of Environmental Psychology.

== Education ==
McCunn earned a Bachelor of Arts in psychology from the University of Victoria in 2004, followed by a Master of Science in psychology from the same institution in 2011, and a PhD in psychology in 2016. In 2022, she earned a Master of Science in applied neuroscience from King's College London.

== Academic career ==
From 2015 to 2017, McCunn was an assistant professor of psychology at the University of Washington Tacoma. In 2017, she joined Vancouver Island University, where she is a professor of psychology and director of the Environmental Psychology Research Lab. She also holds an adjunct associate professor appointment in the department of psychology at the University of Victoria.

McCunn teaches courses in research methods, environmental psychology, neuropsychology, the history of psychology, and introductory psychology. She supervises undergraduate and graduate theses, and reviews science proposals for national and international funding agencies, such as the Canadian Space Agency, NASA, and Canada's Social Science and Humanities Research Council. McCunn often presents research and gives invited addresses at multidisciplinary conferences.

Her published research has focused on the intersection of psychology and sustainability, health care, engineering, facilities management, and urban design in various physical environments including offices, schools, libraries, prisons, and hospitals. Her empirical work involves formal collaboration with school districts, health authorities, municipalities, and architecture firms.

McCunn is the Principal of McCunn & Associates Consulting—a firm dedicated to applying research-based environmental psychological practices to real-world challenges in planning, sustainability, healthcare, and urban design.

== Publications ==
McCunn has published over fifty peer-reviewed articles, technical reports, book chapters and reviews, encyclopedia entries, and other contributions in the media. In 2025, her edited book “Becoming an Environmental Psychologist: Autobiographical Career Paths Toward Applied Social Science” was published by Anthem/First Hill Books. A full list of publications can be found on her website.

== Professional Service ==
After serving as an associate editor of the Journal of Environmental Psychology from 2019 to 2021, McCunn was appointed co-editor-in-chief of the journal in 2021. She is also on the editorial board for the journal Environmental Psychology Research. From 2019 to 2023, she was an associate editor for the journal Cities & Health—during that time, she co-guest edited two special issues for the journal. She is a past chair of the Environmental Psychology Section of the Canadian Psychological Association (CPA), and of the Environmental Design Research Association. While Chair of the environmental psychology section of the CPA, she led the preparation of a position paper titled “Addressing Climate Change in Canada: The Importance of Psychological Science” that won the CPA's John C. Service award in 2020. The position paper was the source of her guest editorship of the CPA's public-facing magazine Psynopsis for a special issue titled “Psychology and Climate Change” in 2021. McCunn serves on the Canadian National Panel for the International Union of Psychological Science (IUPsyS), and is one of two Canadian delegates to its General Assembly. She is also a member of the IUPsyS working group on crisis response.
