= Jannik Balint =

German politician (born 1996)

Member of the Landtag of Saxony-Anhalt
- Assuming office 6 October 2026
- Succeeding: Kerstin Godenrath
- Constituency: Halle III

Personal details
- Born: 18 November 1996 (age 29)
- Party: Die Linke (since 2021)

Jannik Balint (born 18 November 1996) is a German politician who was elected member of the Landtag of Saxony-Anhalt in 2026. He has served as co-chairman of Die Linke in Halle (Saale) since 2024.
