= Alliance for Human Rights, Animal and Nature Protection =

Alliance for Human Rights, Animal and Nature Protection Allianz für Menschenrechte, Tier- und Naturschutz
- Leader: Josef Fassl
- Founded: November 2013
- Split from: Human Environment Animal Protection Party
- Headquarters: Magdeburg
- Membership (2021): 97
- Ideology: Animal rights Animal welfare

Website
- https://www.tierschutzallianz.de/

The Alliance for Human Rights, Animal and Nature Protection, commonly the Animal Protection Alliance (German: Allianz für Menschenrechte, Tier- und Naturschutz, Tierschutzallianz) is a political party in Germany founded in 2013. It was founded by members of the Human Environment Animal Protection Party who believed that the party had failed to distance itself from the right-wing.

The party centres animal rights and welfare and describes "tolerance, open-mindedness, and social responsibility" as its core values. It supports the abolition of factory farming and animal testing, banning of the use of wild animals in entertainment and hunting, and proposes tax incentives to plant-derived products over animal-based products. The party also supports direct democracy, the lowering of the Bundestag electoral threshold from 5% to 3%, establishment of a universal basic income, the right to housing, gender equality, and greater rights for victims of crime.

The Animal Protection Alliance is based in Saxony-Anhalt and has run mostly in state and local elections. The party won 1.0% of votes in the 2016 Saxony-Anhalt state election, and 0.5% in 2021. It ran a list in the state in the 2021 federal election, winning 1.1% of votes (0.0% nationally).
