= Firewall against the far-right in Germany =

Political strategy in Germany

The "Brandmauer" or the "firewall against the far-right" in Germany is a strategy of noncooperation, demarcation, and deplatforming by mainstream political parties and others within German society to suppress the growing influence of far-right politics in Germany, from parties such as the Alternative for Germany (AfD) and Die Heimat (formerly the National Democratic Party). The policy enjoys widespread support in Germany, but is also seen as potentially undemocratic.

In 2024, the AfD saw substantial gains in Germany's eastern states such as in Thuringia, Saxony, and Brandenburg, which intensified public discourse on whether the firewall should be maintained and, if so, how best to reinforce it. This debate spurred widespread protests against rightwing extremism in 2024, which drew hundreds of thousands. These protestors have made historical comparisons to Nazi Germany, particularly to the Nazi seizure of power, emphasizing their demand for a firewall against the far-right with their slogans "We are the firewall" (German: Wir sind die Brandmauer!) and "Never again is now” (German: Nie wieder ist jetzt). The Federal Minister of Defense, Boris Pistorius (SPD), shared these concerns, cautioning against a repeat of history by highlighting the dangers of weak public support for democracy during the late Weimar Republic.

As for current strategies to sideline the far-right, some members of the center-right CDU have proposed "appropriating the concerns of the AfD" to most effectively diminish its influence. However, some research by political scientists indicates that adopting typical far-right themes does not diminish support for far-right parties. On the contrary, scholars have found that these parties can benefit when mainstream political organisations make far-right views appear socially acceptable, thereby legitimising controversial statements.

The debate on and policy of noncooperation with far-right German parties is also influenced by discussions on how best to manage far-right parties at the European level following an increase in their support in the 2024 European Parliament elections, particularly in light of the rise of far-right parties gaining government influence in other countries.

== Use of the term "firewall" ==
The term "Brandmauer" (meaning firewall) is used by the media and politicians as a metaphorical barrier between the establishment parties, and those they perceive to be anti-democratic.

The German political network "Hand in Hand" promotes the hashtag #WeAreTheFirewall (German: #WirSindDieBrandmauer) as part of its campaign to actively oppose the "strengthening of the extreme right in Germany and Europe" and the "normalisation of right-wing policies and discourse".

In English language media, there is also widespread reporting on the issue of the German firewall.

=== Academic research ===
Research examining the firewall suggests that statements made by mainstream politicians may inadvertently contribute more to eroding norms of tolerance compared to those made by far-right politicians. This phenomenon is thought to occur because mainstream politicians may face less opposition from left-wing individuals, highlighting their influential role in shaping social norms.

== Strategies ==
One proposed measure involves strengthening the independence of the German Constitutional Court by requiring changes to its legal basis to be approved by a two-thirds super-majority rather than a simple majority.

=== In local government ===
Regarding the way of dealing with the far-right in local government, Giesbers et al. 2021 suggested multiple measures, reaching from measures to take before the first meeting, internal agreements and networking, inter-group coordination, the constituent meeting, public statements, regarding how to elect people to offices, committees and positions, the everyday committee work, and also tips for dealing with far-rights personally and dealing with motions wisely. As a concrete measure for maintaining a firewall towards the far-right on a local level, they proposed the following concrete actions to take:

- "In local council work, the following should be observed:
  - No joint proposals should be submitted with rightwing factions.
  - No motions from rightwing factions should be accepted.
  - Own proposals should be formulated in a way that prevents support from rightwing parties.
  - Approaches and applause from rightwing factions should be rejected through situational distancing.
  - No joint statements involving rightwing factions should be issued.
  - No personnel nominations from or supported by rightwing factions should be accepted.
  - No joint factions should be formed.
  - No joint press conferences should be held.
  - Leftist premises should not be rented out.
  - No joint events should be organised."

An attempt to formalise these concepts was made in February 2025, when the SPD-led council in Dortmund attempted to pass a motion that all of its decisions must only be approved by a majority of non-AfD councillors, which incurred opposition by the CDU, FDP, and AfD. The local administration of Arnsberg declared the motion illegal, stating that it would make AfD representatives second class councillors. The lord mayor of Dortmund, Thomas Westphal (SPD), rejected this objection but lost the 2025 local election and was replaced by Alexander Kalouti of the CDU, who abandoned the original motion.

== Support for the firewall ==
The success of the AfD in elections in the 2020s, particularly in states such as Thuringia, Saxony-Anhalt, and Mecklenburg-Vorpommern, has increased concerns about the extremism, as well as the prevalence of xenophobic and anti-democratic rhetoric. The re-election of Roland Schliewe, known for controversial remarks about North Africans and support for candidates associated with symbols linked to the ideologies of the Nazis and Ku Klux Klan, in 2024, and the success of the AfD in state elections in 2026 have caused further concern.

The political scientist Dr. Simon Franzmann has noted that Germany must coexist with right-wing populist parties containing far-right elements for the foreseeable future. Another political scientist, Dr. Benjamin Höhne, says that such an environment serves to underscore the value of a robust firewall in the hopes of safeguarding democratic norms and preventing extremist ideologies from becoming mainstream.

== Criticism of the firewall ==
Some critics argue that the political firewall could be undemocratic. For instance, in February 2024, a protest sign reading "democracy without firewall" was noticeably displayed during a demonstration in Lübben, where accusations of Nazi affiliations were refuted. Previously, the town of Lübben had made headlines due to far-right extremist activities.

U.S. Vice President JD Vance has openly criticised the policy, claiming that, in a democracy, "there is no room for firewalls".

Johann Wadephul, deputy chair of the CDU/CSU parliamentary group, has claimed the firewall helped AfD claim victimhood and skirt responsibility. Former Health Minister Jens Spahn has echoed those claims, stating that AfD should be treated "in parliamentary procedures and processes like any other opposition party".

To avoid coalitions with the AfD, there has been an increase in Grand Coalitions, which some suggest has increased support for the AfD position that other parties are a cartel, as well as producing less effective governments.

Despite the firewall, some aspects of AfD policy, such as more restrictive immigration policy have been taken on by mainstream parties, meaning that the firewall may be less effective than intended.

== Forms of cooperation with the Far-Right ==
Scholars from the left-wing Rosa Luxemburg Foundation published a study in March 2024 titled "Will the firewall hold? - Study on cooperation with the extreme right in East German municipalities". They identified 121 instances of cooperation between, what they called, "democratic parties" and "far-right parties" at the municipal level in former Eastern German states from summer 2019 to the end of 2023. Their key finding was that among all major political parties, the Christian Democratic Union of Germany (CDU) had the highest number of collaborations with the Alternative for Germany (AfD) so far, primarily through supporting AfD motions. The study categorized these collaborations into various forms, including joint voting behaviors, joint elections of officials, and agreements.

Cases where "democratic parties" supported AfD motions have been covered by the media, notably in Saxony's district council of Bautzen. MDR Investigativ surveyed all central German districts and independent cities to determine if AfD motions received majority support in their local parliaments across Saxony, Saxony-Anhalt, and Thuringia. The investigation found that substantive AfD motions were approved in at least 18 out of 50 parliaments, often with support from other parties, notably the CDU.

On 14 September 2024, scholars from Berlin Social Sciences Center showed that between 2019 and 2024, 80% of motions brought in by AfD in local German parliaments in former East-Germany did not receive any support from the other parties. Still, 20% of the total of 2,348 AfD proposals submitted in that time frame were supported by at least one member of another party, 10% by at least five members of other parties. The authors also analyzed the topics the supported motions were about and state that cooperation was more prevalent in topics such as transport, sport, culture and the budget - less in topics such as asylum and safety.

=== On the federal level ===
In late January 2025, Christian-Democratic leader Friedrich Merz introduced a resolution calling for more stringent measures on immigration and border crossings, saying he would rely on AfD votes to push it through if necessary. On 29 January, the resolution passed by a vote of 348 to 345 (a majority of 3), with the Christian Democrats, the FDP and the AfD voting in favor, the BSW abstaining and all other parties voting against. This was the first time the AfD had played a decisive role in the passage of a parliamentary proposal. BBC News reported that this meant the firewall had cracked.

== Stances of political parties ==
All major democratic German political parties have committed to taking a firm stance against the far-right, particularly right-wing extremists and other undemocratic political actors. However, these commitments vary in terms of their boldness and consistency.

=== Christian Democratic Union (CDU) ===
The Christian Democratic Union of Germany (CDU) officially maintains a stance of incompatibility regarding coalitions and similar forms of cooperation with both The Left and the Alternative for Germany (AfD) since 2018. In May 2024, Daniel Günther (CDU), Minister President of Schleswig-Holstein, publicly argued against equating The Left (Die Linke) with the Alternative for Germany (AfD).

Political scientist Constantin Wurthmann empirically examined the stances of voters on firewall issues. His results indicate that potential CDU/CSU voters generally oppose any rapprochement or cooperation with the AfD, although a small minority of conservative respondents express openness to such cooperation.

In 2023, CDU Secretary General Carsten Linnemann stated about the AfD: "There are proven Nazis in this party, I don't want to have anything to do with them." Friedrich Merz, Chairman of the CDU, reaffirmed on X (formerly Twitter) in July 2023: "To clarify once again, and I have never said otherwise: The decision of @CDU applies. There will also be no cooperation between the #CDU and the AfD at the municipal level."

In an interview with the German TV channel Die Welt on July 1, 2024, Thorsten Frei, a member of the CDU in the German parliament and First Parliamentary Secretary of CDU, discussed his party's approach to the AfD's ambitions to become the strongest force nationwide. He emphasized their readiness to confront the AfD directly on substantive issues, acknowledging the need to take them seriously rather than marginalizing them. Frei also expressed concerns about violence from left-wing activists, which he views as a major threat to democracy. He previously said in a March 2024 interview that cooperation with the AfD in the parliamentary sector is categorically rejected by the CDU. Following criticism for parts of the CDU collaborating with the AfD in passing legislation in Thuringia, Frei emphasized that such actions do not reflect a normalization of interactions with the AfD within the CDU, describing the party as predominantly right-wing extremist.

On the other hand, his colleague Andreas Rödder argued that parliamentary votes involving the AfD are part of regular political procedures, cautioning against the potential long-term consequences for the democratic-right center if the CDU fails in its opposition role. Also other individual CDU politicians do not necessarily view it as problematic when the CDU supports motions proposed by the AfD. Kerstin Friesenhahn, a CDU politician in the Stralsund parliament, articulated to ZDF: "You have to evaluate the proposals themselves. Only then should you consider whether they are beneficial for the city or not. Regardless of the party."

When it comes to concrete cases on the local level, German broadcaster ZDF for instance covered a case in Krauschwitz, where "instead of coffee, beer is preferred after meetings with AfD colleagues", they titled. CDU council member Mario Mackowiak remarked on that cooperation in the local council: "We have zero firewall."

Another example is Udo Witschas (CDU), district administrator in the Saxon city of Bautzen, who was in contact and exchanged non-public information about asylum seekers with the local district chairman of the Neo-Nazi and ultranationalist party Die Heimat (named NPD at that time). In December 2022, major parts of his CDU colleagues on the district-level voted for an AfD proposal on cutting benefits for refugees. After he justified his stance in a Christmas speech a few days later, official representatives of federal-level from the CDU distanced themselves. On the other side, Jörg Urban, the chairman of Saxony's AfD - which has secured right-wing extremist endeavors - openly sided with Udo Witschas. Udo Witschas is still CDU party representative in Bautzen as of July 2024.

In July 2024, Alexander Räuscher, CDU deputy in Saxony-Anhalt, demanded "an end of the so-called firewall" and instead advocated for the domestic intelligence service of Germany to monitor the Greens party. Consequently, his council faction expelled him, leaving him as a non-attached member of the local council. As of 10 July 2024, Alexander Räuscher is still member of the CDU.

There is an ongoing discussion (as of July 2024) in the CDU whether a firewall should also apply towards the recently formed Bündnis Sahra Wagenknecht.

In February 2025, the CDU collaborated with the AfD in the Bundestag to push through a non-binding resolution on the detention of illegal aliens at borders. This was the first time since 1945 that the cordon sanitaire had been broken in Germany. This event provokes large-scale demonstrations across Germany, with between 160,000 and 250,000 people in Berlin on February 2, and over 220,000 demonstrators in several of the country's major cities the day before.

=== Social Democratic Party (SPD) ===
The Social Democratic Party of Germany (SPD) in the national parliament operates a working group titled "Strategies against Right-Extremism".

During the 2024 European Parliament election campaign, the SPD prominently featured the firewall against the far-right as one of its core topics.

=== Alternative for Germany (AfD) ===
Although much of the discourse in Germany focuses on how other democratic parties handle the Alternative for Germany (AfD) - which is in parts officially right-extremist, but there are also calls directed at the AfD regarding their management of right-wing extremists.

The party maintains an "incompatibility list" for AfD membership, which includes political groups that are prohibited by the Federal Ministry of the Interior and Community (based on article 9 of the German constitution) or under observation, specifying whether exclusions apply nationwide or only in individual federal states. Notably, far-right and neo-Nazi parties such as Third Way (Germany) and The Homeland, formerly National Democratic Party of Germany, are listed. This prohibition aligns with common practice where parties explicitly prohibit dual memberships. However, the chair of Saxony's AfD could not definitively rule out accepting right-wing extremists as members.

The civil society campaign "We are the firewall", launched during the 2024 German anti-extremism protests, garnered endorsement from multiple non-governmental organizations. In a parliamentary inquiry, the AfD sought clarification from the Federal Government on whether it was aware of the campaign and its supporters, and "whether any of these organizations received federal funding". The government responded that it had no information on the campaign or its supporters, clarifying that "We Are the Firewall" was neither initiated nor financially supported by the government.

Hans-Christoph Berndt, the AfD faction leader in Brandenburg, urged other parties to dismantle their firewalls against the AfD despite the state branch being classified as a suspected case of right-wing extremism by the Federal Office for the Protection of the Constitution. As argument, he emphasized the AfD's appeal among younger voters, as evidenced by the European elections 2024.

=== Alliance 90/The Greens (Grüne) ===
Some individual local party representatives of the Alliance 90/The Greens (Grüne) have expressed criticism of the party's stringent position, advocating for a more pragmatic approach and positioning themselves against overly rigid categorical guidelines while the majority agrees on a necessity to keep up the concept of the firewall.

=== The Left (Die Linke) ===
The Thuringian state branch of The Left (Die Linke) maintains a staunch stance against any cooperation with "far-right, fascist, or anti-democratic entities," categorically labeling any alignment with the AfD as collaboration and threatening party expulsion for involved members.

A practical example of this stance was demonstrated by Bodo Ramelow, the Minister-President of Thuringia, who refused to shake hands with right-extremist AfD state chairman Björn Höcke, citing a warning against hate and agitation. Ramelow declared in his inaugural speech that he would only consider shaking Höcke's hand again when the AfD defends democracy instead of undermining it.

=== Sahra Wagenknecht Alliance (BSW) ===
Chairperson of the Sahra Wagenknecht Alliance (BSW), Sahra Wagenknecht, said in an interview on 17 June 2024: "I think the term 'firewall' is pretty stupid". Additionally, in July 2024 she said she would not form a coalition with either Alliance 90/The Greens nor the Alternative for Germany (AfD). However, in 2026, she claimed that her party would be willing to enter into cabinet-formation agreements with the AfD in State parliaments; she proposed a formula whereby AfD and BSW would jointly choose a non-partisan candidate acceptable to both parties and vote for them as Minister-President.

=== Free Democratic Party (FDP) ===
The Federal Executive Board of the Free Democratic Party decided on a "Firewall against the AfD" in 2020, asserting:

"As Free Democrats, we advocate a centrist policy. It is our fundamental belief that there must be a firewall against the right. Therefore, we reaffirm our categorical rejection of cooperating with the AfD or accepting any form of dependency on them at any level."

In an interview with the newspaper FAZ, Federal Minister of Justice Marco Buschmann (FDP) emphasised his belief in maintaining a firewall towards a party like the AfD, stating that coordinated cooperation, including agreements or coalitions, is not possible.

== Hypothetical coalitions involving the AfD ==
Due to the cordon sanitaire (usually called Brandmauer (firewall) in Germany) all other parties have established against the AfD, hypothetical coalitions involving the AfD are rarely discussed. A coalition of CDU/CSU, AfD and FDP would have had a majority in the Bundestag elected in 2021 and 2025, (Note: The FDP lost all of its seats in the 2025 election, so it would have been a CDU/CSU-AfD coalition.) but was not seriously discussed publicly by either media or politicians.

Such a coalition does not have a common nickname, but the term “Bahamas coalition”, in reference to the colors of the flag of the Bahamas (including the AfD's light blue, the CDU/CSU's black, and the FDP's yellow), was coined in 2013. Other coalitions involving the AfD are considered even more unlikely due to lack of parliamentary majority, ideological differences and the cordon sanitaire.

A hypothetical coalition involving the AfD and CDU would have had a majority in the state parliament of Saxony elected in Saxony in 2019 (Note: (60 seats needed for a majority, CDU 45, AfD 38. Total 83 seats)) and 2024, (Note: (61 seats needed for a majority, CDU 41, AfD 40. Total 81 seats)) in the state parliament of Thuringia in 2024. (Note: (45 seats needed for a majority, AfD 32, CDU 23. Total 55 seats)) and in the state parliament of Saxony-Anhalt in 2026 Saxony-Anhalt state election (Note: (42 seats needed for a majority, AfD 39, CDU 15. Total 55 seats)) However, the CDU rejected this due to the cordon sanitaire.

== See also ==
- Cartel party theory
- Cordon sanitaire (politics) § Germany
- French Republican Front
- Grand coalition
- Prohibited political parties in Germany
- Radical right (Europe)
- Uniparty
