= Clara Drechsler =

German author and translator (born 1961)

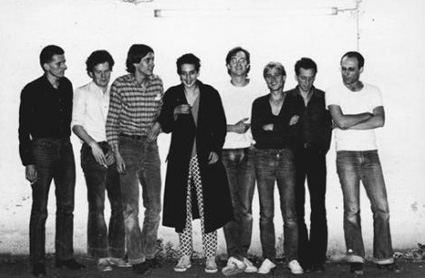
Clara Drechsler, fourth from left, among other founders of the magazine Spex, 1980

Clara Drechsler (born June 1961) is a Cologne author and translator who helped shape German pop journalism in the 1980s.

== Life ==
Drechsler wrote mainly for the music magazine Spex, which she co-founded in 1980, and for Miss Vogue. Her most important literary innovation was the invention of a style characterized by numerous apparent trivialities and subjectivities, an innovation of the category "interview", which she transformed into a kind of investigative journalism through radical accuracy. Her interviews with Slayer and the Suicidal Tendencies are considered milestones. In the early 1990s, she left Spex and worked for Haffmans Verlag. Among others, she translated works by Billy Childish, Bret Easton Ellis, Irvine Welsh and Nick Hornby into German.

== Articles (selection) ==
- Andreas Dorau. Ein Mann will nach oben (Spex 11/1982, pp. 18–19)
- Au Pairs. Tot aber lebendig (Spex 10/1982, pp. 12–13)
- The Human League (Spex 3+4/1982, pp. 10–11)
- Knacks. Da birst der Zauberwürfel (Spex 1983, p. 29)
- Don't you have a hairdresser you can tell that to? (Spex 1983)
- Die Zwinkermänner (Spex 4/1983, pp. 27–29)
- Paul Weller (Spex 5/1983, pp. 29–31)
- Style Council. Café Blur (Spex 1984, pp. 14–18)
- Sublime senselessness. Slayer (Spex 6/1987, pp. 16–18)
- Suicidal Tendencies (Spex 8/1987, pp. 22–24)
- Heiter der Ernst, sinnlos der Sinn, Welt die Kunst! (Spex, 9/1991)

== Translations (selection) ==
- Tara Isabella Burton: So schöne Lügen (with Harald Hellmann) DuMont Buchverlag 2019, ISBN 978-3832183707.
- Sam Byers: Schönes neues England (with Harald Hellmann) Tropen 2019, ISBN 978-3608504149.
- Kurt Cobain: Tagebücher (with Harald Hellmann) Kiepenheuer & Witsch 2002, ISBN 978-3462031843.
- Douglas Coupland: Generation A (with Harald Hellmann) Tropen 2010, ISBN 9783608501100.
- Douglas Coupland: Bit Rot: Berichte aus der sich auflösenden Welt (with Harald Hellmann) Blumenbar 2019, ISBN 978-3351050702.
- Bret Easton Ellis: American Psycho (with Harald Hellmann) Kiepenheuer & Witsch 1991, ISBN 9783462021578.
- Bret Easton Ellis: Lunar Park (with Harald Hellmann) Kiepenheuer & Witsch 2006, ISBN 9783462036541.
- A. M. Homes: This book will save your life (with Harald Hellmann) Kiepenheuer & Witsch 2007, ISBN 9783462037678.
- Nick Hornby: High Fidelity (with Harald Hellmann) Kiepenheuer & Witsch 1996, ISBN 9783462025248.
- Nick Hornby: About a Boy (with Harald Hellmann) Kiepenheuer & Witsch 1998, ISBN 9783462027372.
- Nick Hornby: A Long Way Down (with Harald Hellmann) Kiepenheuer & Witsch 2005, ISBN 9783462034554.
- Nick Hornby: Slam (with Harald Hellmann) Kiepenheuer & Witsch 2008, ISBN 9783462039658.
- Nick Hornby: Juliet, Naked (with Harald Hellmann) Kiepenheuer & Witsch 2009, ISBN 9783462041392.
- Miranda July: Zehn Wahrheiten (with Harald Hellmann) Kiepenheuer & Witsch 2016, ISBN 978-3462047691.
- John Lydon: Anger is an Energy: Mein Leben unzensiert (with Harald Hellmann and Werner Schmitz) Heyne Verlag 2015, ISBN 978-3453269774.
- Patti Smith: Just Kids (with Harald Hellmann) Kiepenheuer & Witsch 2010, ISBN 9783462042283.
- Irvine Welsh: Drecksau (with Harald Hellmann) Kiepenheuer & Witsch 1999, ISBN 9783462028669.
- Irvine Welsh: Porno (with Harald Hellmann) Kiepenheuer & Witsch 2004, ISBN 9783462034202.

== Literature about Clara Drechsler ==
- Clara Drechsler: Lebe sparsam – und koche nach Rezept. Interview with Diedrich Diederichsen. In: Spex 10/1995, pp. 56–59.
- Ralf Hinz: Clara Drechsler: Pop als Idiosynkrasie. In: Ders.: Cultural Studies and Pop. Zur Kritik der Urteilskraft wissenschaftlicher und journalistischer Rede über populäre Kultur, Opladen, Wiesbaden 1998, pp. 236–246.
