= Tamara Jenkins =

American filmmaker

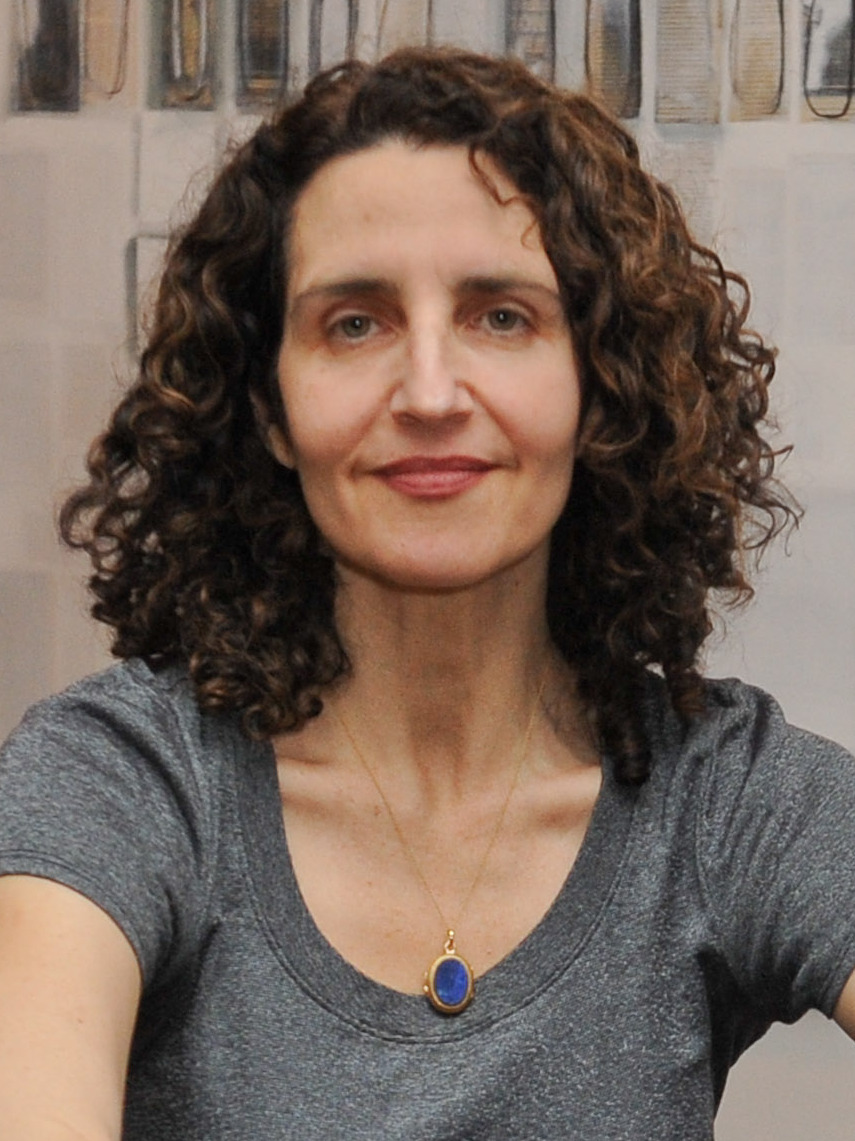
- Jenkins in 2013
- Born: May 2, 1962 (age 64); Philadelphia, Pennsylvania, U.S.
- Occupations: Film director; screenwriter; actress
- Years active: 1991–present
- Spouse: Jim Taylor (m. 2002)
- Children: 1

Tamara Jenkins (born May 2, 1962) is an American filmmaker and occasional actress. She is best known for her feature films Slums of Beverly Hills (1998), The Savages (2007), and Private Life (2018). She received a nomination for the Academy Award for Best Original Screenplay for The Savages.

== Early life ==
Jenkins was born in Philadelphia, the daughter of Lillian and Manuel Jenkins. Her father is Jewish, and her mother is Italian American. After her parents divorced, her father, a former nightclub owner, took custody of her and her three brothers, moving the family to California to work as a car salesman. She lived in Beverly Hills with her father and brothers, and attended Beverly Hills High for a year and a half.

In the 1980s, Jenkins moved to New York City where she performed in various productions, including the first national tours of Chicago, Les Miserables, and Cats, as well as the 1993 Broadway Revival of My Fair Lady. She enrolled in the graduate filmmaking program at New York University's Tisch School of the Arts in the 1990s. Winner of a Guggenheim Fellowship for filmmaking, Jenkins also attended the Sundance Institute Screenwriting and Filmmakers Lab. While in film school, Jenkins worked various jobs, including as a waitress and an assistant.

== Career ==
Jenkins began her career with a short film, 1991's Fugitive Love, which screened at the Sundance Film Festival. Afterwards, she completed a congressional mandate associated with PBS to bring diverse programming to public television that was funded by the Independent Television Service. Another black-and-white short, 1993's Family Remains, followed, which received a Special Jury Prize for Excellence in Short Filmmaking at the 1994 Sundance Film Festival.

Her debut feature film, 1998's semi-autobiographical Slums of Beverly Hills, which she wrote and directed, played at both Sundance and the Cannes Film Festival. Based on her own experience growing up in Beverly Hills in the 1970s, the film is a dark comedy about a nomadic family in Los Angeles. Using photographs Jenkins had kept from her time at Beverly Hills High School, art director Scott Plauch and production designer Dena Roth were able to create an accurate period depiction of Beverly Hills, while also staying true to the autobiographical element which is key to the film's success.

Starring Alan Arkin, Natasha Lyonne and Marisa Tomei, Slums of Beverly Hills was nominated for two Independent Spirit Awards (Best First Feature and Best First Screenplay). Jenkins took a nearly decade-long hiatus to complete her next feature film. In the nine-year gap between her two films, she worked on an eventually abandoned screenplay about photographer Diane Arbus. Before returning to her next feature film, Jenkins branched out to explore theater, essay publications, and nonprofit film and TV work. In 2003, she directed The New Group's theater production of A Likely Story, written and performed by David Cale.

Shortly after her marriage, Jenkins went to Yaddo, the artists' colony in Saratoga Springs, New York, to work on the screenplay that would eventually become 2007's The Savages. For this tragicomedy about a dysfunctional family dealing with the aftershocks of its patriarch's elderly dementia, Jenkins took inspiration from her experiences with her grandmother and father, both of whom were in nursing homes with dementia. Jenkins' father, who was much older than Jenkins’ mother, first needed care when she was in her 30s. Additionally, Jenkins built upon her theater work at The New Group, departing from her previously straight dramas to something far more absurd. The film layers a bright, doll-like color palette upon a bleak and often morbid story, relying on the savage wit of her screenplay to tie the film together.

The project was initially with Focus Features, which she says had given her a "blind deal" to write any script she wanted, but she sought to get a deal elsewhere after what she characterized as a disagreement over casting. Fox Searchlight picked up the film with a modest budget ($8 million) and compressed shooting schedule of 30 days. Starring Laura Linney (who received her third Academy Award nomination for her role) and Philip Seymour Hoffman, the film became a critical success after screening at numerous film festivals, including Sundance and the Toronto International Film Festival. Jenkins was nominated for an Academy Award for Best Original Screenplay.

After the success of The Savages, it took Jenkins eleven years to make her third feature film, Private Life. When discussing the more than a decade-long hiatus, Jenkins noted that successful female directors do not often produce films at the same pace as their male counterparts, stating “It’s systemic. It’s gotta be systemic. There is something in the water.”

Private Life, which starred Paul Giamatti, Kathryn Hahn, Molly Shannon, and Kayli Carter, was also written by Jenkins. The film began production in April 2017, and was given a limited release in theaters on October 5, 2018, by Netflix, which also streamed the film. Private Life follows a couple dealing with infertility, and is based on Jenkins’ own struggles to have a child. Rolling Stone magazine described the movie as "not only about infertility... a tender but unflinching portrait of a couple in the throes of a midlife crisis." Jenkins was nominated at the 2019 Independent Spirit Awards for Best Director and Best Screenplay for the film. Private Life holds a 93% rating on Rotten Tomatoes, making it Jenkins' highest-rated film on the site.

In addition to her work in film, Jenkins' writing has been published in Zoetrope: All-Story and Tin House Magazine. Most recently her essay, "Holy Innocents" appeared in the book Lisa Yuskavage: Small Paintings 1993-2004. She has also directed theater at The New Group, worked with teens creating a sex-education film for the nonprofit organization Scenarios, and directed a series of public service announcements for Amnesty International.

== Style and influences ==
Her process as a filmmaker often begins with images, as she came to filmmaking from the experimental-theatre scene. Her earliest use of film was using slide projectors to project still images as part of a performance piece. Seeing Stranger Than Paradise by Jim Jarmusch inspired her to switch from performance art to filmmaking. She takes inspiration from Lorrie Moore, Lynda Barry, Spalding Gray. Her favorite movies include Dog Day Afternoon and 400 Blows.

== Personal life ==
Jenkins has been married to fellow screenwriter, Jim Taylor, since 2002—himself an Academy Award winner for Sideways (2004), among other nominations. They have one daughter and live in New York City as of 2019. The couple co-wrote the screenplay for the 2018 film, Juliet, Naked (adapted from Nick Hornby's homonymous novel), along with Evgenia Peretz—sister of the film's director, Jesse Peretz.

== Filmography ==
=== Feature films ===
Year	Title	Director	Screenwriter	Producer
1998	Slums of Beverly Hills	Yes	Yes	No
2007	The Savages	Yes	Yes	No
2018	Private Life	Yes	Yes	Yes
2018	Juliet, Naked	No	Yes	No

=== Short films ===
Year	Title	Director	Screenwriter
1991	Fugitive Love	Yes	Yes
1993	Family Remains	Yes	Yes
2004	Choices: The Good, the Bad, the Ugly	Yes	No

=== Actress ===
- Cheap Flight (1996)
- Happy Accidents (2000)
- Love in the Time of Money (2002)

== Awards and nominations ==
Year	Association	Category	Nominated work	Result	Ref
1999	Film Independent Spirit Awards	Best First Screenplay	Slums of Beverly Hills	Nominated	
1999	Film Independent Spirit Awards	Best First Feature	Slums of Beverly Hills	Nominated	
2008	Academy Awards	Best Original Screenplay	The Savages	Nominated	
2008	Film Independent Spirit Awards	Best Director	The Savages	Nominated	
2008	Film Independent Spirit Awards	Best Screenplay	The Savages	Won	
2018	Gotham Awards	Best Screenplay	Private Life	Nominated	
2019	Film Independent Spirit Awards	Best Director	Private Life	Nominated	
2019	Film Independent Spirit Awards	Best Screenplay	Private Life	Nominated	
