= Juliet, Naked (film) =

2018 American romantic comedy film

- Theatrical release poster
- Directed by: Jesse Peretz
- Screenplay by: Tamara Jenkins; Jim Taylor; Evgenia Peretz
- Based on: Juliet, Naked by Nick Hornby
- Produced by: Judd Apatow; Barry Mendel; Albert Berger; Ron Yerxa; Jeffrey Soros
- Starring: Rose Byrne; Ethan Hawke; Chris O'Dowd; Denise Gough; Phil Davis
- Cinematography: Remi Adefarasin
- Edited by: Sabine Hoffman; Robert Nassau
- Music by: Nathan Larson
- Production companies: Rocket Science; Apatow Productions; Bona Fide Productions; Los Angeles Media Fund
- Distributed by: Lionsgate; Roadside Attractions (United States); Universal Pictures; Focus Features (United Kingdom)
- Release dates: January 19, 2018 (Sundance Film Festival); August 17, 2018 (United States)
- Running time: 105 minutes
- Countries: United States; United Kingdom
- Language: English
- Box office: $4.5 million

Juliet, Naked is a 2018 romantic comedy film directed by Jesse Peretz based on Nick Hornby's 2009 novel of the same name. It centers on the story of Annie (Rose Byrne) and her unlikely romance with singer-songwriter Tucker Crowe (Ethan Hawke), who is also the subject of her boyfriend Duncan's (Chris O'Dowd) long-time music obsession. The film premiered at the Sundance Film Festival on January 19, 2018.

== Plot ==
Annie Platt contemplates escaping her life in Sandcliffe, England. She works as a museum curator and lives with her boyfriend of 15 years, Duncan. Duncan is a college teacher obsessed with Tucker Crowe, an American musician last heard from in 1993. An album titled Juliet, Naked arrives in the mail, containing acoustic demos from Crowe's breakthrough album Juliet. Annie and Duncan argue over its quality, leading to Annie writing an anonymous and negative review on Duncan's fan site dedicated to Crowe.

Crowe himself emails Annie about the review, thanking her for her honesty, and they strike up correspondence. Crowe shares his regrets at being a poor father to multiple children with different mothers, while Annie discloses her disappointment at not having any children herself. Crowe lives on his ex's property to be near his youngest son Jackson in America. Lizzie, his pregnant daughter from another relationship, visits him from London. It is also revealed Crowe has twin sons from another relationship. Before leaving, Lizzie offers him the phone number of his other daughter Grace. Gina, a new teacher at the college Duncan works at, indulges his obsession with Crowe and the two end up sleeping together. Duncan confesses about their tryst to Annie, who dumps him and asks him to move out.

When Lizzie has her baby prematurely, Crowe takes Jackson with him to London to check on her. He and Annie agree to meet, but he has a heart attack. She visits him in the hospital, where she meets Jackson, Lizzie, his twin boys, along with all of their mothers, who have flown to his bedside. Crowe asks to see Sandcliffe, and travels there with Jackson after being discharged.

Duncan runs into Annie and Crowe, who introduces himself, but Duncan does not believe him. Annie soon finds Duncan lurking outside her home, and Crowe proves his identity with his passport. Duncan stays for dinner, but his obsession with Juliet annoys Crowe to the point where Crowe admit he feels the album is worthless. An offended Duncan leaves, asserting that art may mean more to the audience and how important the album has been to him.

Crowe later tells Annie the true reason why he abandoned music: 25 years earlier, the ex whose breakup inspired Juliet had surprised him at a gig with their baby, Grace. When left holding Grace in the restroom, Crowe had a panic attack and fled from the gig, leaving the public eye altogether. Crowe calls Grace in an attempt to reconcile, but she wants nothing to do with him.

At Annie's museum exhibition, she confesses her romantic interest in Crowe, who reciprocates. The town's mayor has him sing for the exhibition and he reluctantly performs "Waterloo Sunset" by the Kinks. Annie and Crowe try to have sex but are interrupted by an ill Jackson, who wants to go home. Annie drives Crowe and Jackson to Lizzie's home, where Annie bids them farewell. She returns home where Duncan pleads for a fresh start together, but she declines. A year later, Annie emails Crowe that she moved to London and decided to have a child on her own; they agree to meet.

During the credits, a video of Duncan from his site reveals that Crowe has released a new album So Where Was I? inspired by Annie. The album's song titles suggests that Crowe and Annie are living happily together, much to Duncan's chagrin.

== Cast ==
- Rose Byrne as Annie Platt
- Ethan Hawke as Tucker Crowe
- Chris O'Dowd as Duncan Thomson
- Azhy Robertson as Jackson, Tucker's son
- Lily Brazier as Ros Platt, Annie's sister
- Ayoola Smart as Lizzie, Tucker's daughter
- Lily Newmark as Carly
- Denise Gough as Gina
- Eleanor Matsuura as Cat, Tucker's ex
- Megan Dodds as Carrie, Tucker's ex
- Emma Paetz as Grace
- Jimmy O. Yang as Elliott
- Phil Davis as Mayor Terry Barton

== Production ==
Harbour Street in Broadstairs was the exterior for Annie Platt's house in Sandcliff. Broadstairs' streets and beach also featured as Sandcliff, including Morelli's Ice Cream Parlour. Further filming took place at Ramsgate Maritime Museum, which features as Sandcliff Museum interior where Annie Platt works, as well as the Royal Harbour in Ramsgate, which can also be seen in various scenes. Production also filmed at Home Farm in the Borough of Swale which features as Tucker Crowe's 'mancave' and his ex-wife's house in the US.

The movie includes new songs written by Ryan Adams, Robyn Hitchcock, Conor Oberst and M. Ward, as well as the film's composer, Nathan Larson.

== Release ==
Lionsgate and sister company Roadside Attractions acquired US rights to distribute the film, and planned to release the film on August 17, 2018, at select theaters, while a nationwide release occurred on August 31, 2018.

== Reception ==
On review aggregation website Rotten Tomatoes, the film holds an approval rating of 82% based on 170 reviews, and an average rating of 6.9/10. The website's critical consensus reads, "Juliet, Naked's somewhat familiar narrative arc is elevated by standout work from a charming cast led by a well-matched Rose Byrne and Ethan Hawke." Metacritic gives the film a weighted average rating of 67 out of 100, based on 33 reviews, indicating "generally favorable" reviews.

A. O. Scott of The New York Times praised Hawke's performance but criticized the sexism of the film saying "but it’s still the dudes who demand most of the attention, and the women who are expected to derive satisfaction from granting it." Owen Gleiberman of Variety called it "a gently winning romantic comedy" and praised the performances of O'Dowd, Byrne, and Hawke.
