= PMQ =

PMQ, PMQs or pmq may refer to:

== Places and buildings ==
- PMQ (Hong Kong) (formerly Police Married Quarters), a site in Hong Kong
- PMQ (military housing) (Permanent Married Quarters or Private Married Quarters), Canadian military housing
- Perito Moreno Airport (IATA code: PMQ), an airport in Argentina

== Other uses ==
- Prime Minister's Questions (PMQs), a constitutional convention in the UK
  - Prime Minister's Questions, television and radio coverage on BBC Parliament and other BBC channels
- Pame languages (ISO 639 code: pmq)
- "PMQ", a short story by Robert Harris on the collection Speaking with the Angel

== See also ==
- CFB Lincoln Park PMQ, Calgary, a residential neighbourhood in Canada
