= A Long Way Down (film) =

- Theatrical release poster
- Directed by: Pascal Chaumeil
- Screenplay by: Jack Thorne
- Based on: A Long Way Down by Nick Hornby
- Produced by: Finola Dwyer; Amanda Posey
- Starring: Pierce Brosnan; Toni Collette; Aaron Paul; Imogen Poots; Rosamund Pike; Sam Neill
- Cinematography: Ben Davis
- Edited by: Chris Gill; Barney Pilling
- Music by: Dario Marianelli
- Production companies: DCM Productions; BBC Films; Wildgaze Films; HanWay Films
- Distributed by: Lionsgate (United Kingdom); DCM Film Distribution (Germany and Switzerland)
- Release dates: 10 February 2014 (Berlin International Film Festival); 21 March 2014 (United Kingdom)
- Running time: 96 minutes
- Countries: United Kingdom; Germany
- Language: English
- Budget: $22.7 million
- Box office: $7.1 million

A Long Way Down (originally titled Up & Down) is a 2014 black comedy film directed by Pascal Chaumeil, loosely based on author Nick Hornby's 2005 novel of the same name. It stars Pierce Brosnan, Toni Collette, Imogen Poots, and Aaron Paul.

The plot centres around four strangers who meet on the roof of a London building on New Year's Eve, each with the intent of committing suicide. Their plans for death in solitude are ruined when they meet as they decide to come down from the roof alive, however temporary that may be.

The film received mostly negative reviews, with criticism of the source material and the film's cast.

== Plot ==
The narrator, Martin Sharpe, explains his reasoning for his planned suicide: the once-successful media personality became infamous for a scandal involving a teenager, landing him in jail and costing him his marriage, livelihood and child.

Martin is contemplating suicide on New Year's Eve on the roof of the Toppers Building, high above London's streets. He is interrupted by a woman, Maureen, who has the same fate in mind. She shyly offers to wait her turn, until two other strangers, a young woman named Jess and a pizza deliverer called J.J., also turn up.

Martin is recognised by the others, having been a popular television personality before going to prison for a relationship with a girl who turned out to be 15. After making introductions, and the ladder he hauled up to the roof falls to the street below, the frustrated Martin abruptly leaves.

Beginning to drive off, as it is starting to rain, Martin picks up the others one by one. Jess asks to be left at a club to talk to her ex. The others soon follow her in, concerned for her mental state. Soon, an ambulance comes for her, as she has accidentally ODed.

At the hospital, talking things over, the four strangers sign a pact. They vow to wait at least until Valentine's Day before again attempting suicide.

Maureen has a disabled son she adores, but little life beyond that. Jess is the daughter of a politician and their relationship is strained after her older sister disappeared without a trace. J.J. is an American who once played in a band, but while his three new acquaintances are suicidally depressed, he claims that he is terminally ill with cancer.

The tabloids print a story including Martin and Jess, as she is a politicians daughter, about the suicide so the four convene in Maureen's house to discuss a plan of action. To profit from misfortune, Martin hatches a scheme that makes them the talk of London, claiming their mass suicide was interrupted by a vision. They end up on his old TV chat show, where Martin's former co-host Penny makes her guests feel humiliated and even more depressed.

The four go on vacation to get away from London's attention. They enjoy each other's company until it is revealed that J.J.'s claim about cancer is a lie and the intervention of a journalist named Kathy drives them apart.

After the vacation, the four resume their lives. When Maureen's son Matty suffers a heart attack, Jess and Martin visit Maureen in the hospital but J.J. cannot be contacted. They realise it is Valentine's Day and that their pact has ended. All four end up back in London on the very same rooftop with the other three coaxing J.J. away from the edge successfully.

On New Year's Eve that year, they video call each other. Martin is looking after his daughter, Maureen is enjoying herself at a New Year's party, and J.J. and Jess are in a happy relationship.

== Cast ==
- Pierce Brosnan as Martin Sharp
- Toni Collette as Maureen Thompson
- Imogen Poots as Jess Crichton
- Aaron Paul as J.J. Maguire
- Rosamund Pike as Penny
- Sam Neill as shadow minister Crichton
- Tuppence Middleton as Kathy Miller
- Joe Cole as Chas Johnson
- Josef Altin as Maureen's son Matty

== Production ==
Brosnan has stated that TV presenter Richard Madeley was an inspiration to him in playing the role. While reading the script for the film in the Colombe D'Or restaurant in Saint-Paul-de-Vence, Brosnan stated that he saw Madeley and his wife Judy Finnigan and later said, "I think it's his sheer ebullience and enthusiasm. You have to be almost shamanic to do it, really, and really believe in yourself. And it's a thin line between being affable and being really annoying. So it takes a brave soul, really."

== Release ==
The film premiered at the 64th Berlin International Film Festival on 10 February 2014.

== Reception ==
A Long Way Down received negative reviews from critics. Review aggregation website Rotten Tomatoes reported an approval rating of 22%, based on 50 reviews, with an average score of 4.2/10. The site's consensus reads, "Tonally jumbled and conceptually ill-advised, A Long Way Down bungles its source material and wastes a talented cast." At Metacritic, which assigns a rating out of 100 to reviews from mainstream critics, the film received an average score of 34, based on 21 reviews, indicating "generally unfavorable reviews".

In 2015, the film won a Voice Award from the American Substance Abuse and Mental Health Services Administration.
