= How to Be Good =

2001 novel by Nick Hornby

- First edition cover
- Author: Nick Hornby
- Language: English
- Genre: Novel
- Publisher: Viking Press
- Publication date: 31 May 2001
- Publication place: England
- Media type: Print (Hardcover and Paperback) & Audio CD
- Pages: 256 pp
- ISBN: 0-670-88823-0
- OCLC: 46393465

How to Be Good is a 2001 novel by the English writer Nick Hornby. It centers on characters Katie Carr, a doctor, and her husband, David Grant. The story begins when David stops being "The Angriest Man In Holloway" and begins to be "good" with the help of his spiritual healer, DJ GoodNews (who also shows up briefly in Hornby's A Long Way Down). The pair go about this by nominally convincing people to give their spare bedrooms to the homeless, but as their next scheme comes around, "reversal" (being good to people one has not been good to in the past), this proves to be fruitless and thus David gives up his strivings and his plans for a book on how to be good, appropriately named "How to be Good."

The protagonist, Katie, briefly encounters a minor character named Dick whose description and attitude towards music are reminiscent of the character of the same name from Hornby's first novel, High Fidelity.

== Audiobook ==
How to be Good is available on audiobook, both abridged and unabridged. The abridged version is read by Frances Barber and the unabridged version is read by Clare Higgins.
