= Johnny Hornby =

British businessman

- Citizenship: UK
- Education: History and Politics
- Alma mater: University of Edinburgh
- Occupations: Chairman and founder
- Organization(s): The&Partnership (formerly CHI&Partners)
- Spouse: Clare Hornby
- Children: 5
- Relatives: Nick Hornby (half-brother)

Johnny Hornby is an English marketing executive. He is the founder of the marketing and PR holdings company The&Partnership. Previously, Hornby was managing director at TBWA, the marketing company which managed Tony Blair's 2001 election campaign.

== Early life ==
Hornby's father, Derek Hornby, was a British business executive who was chairman of London and Continental Railways. His mother was a journalist. Hornby was born in Leamington Spa, but due to his father's work, he attended a state school in the south of France before moving to Connecticut. At the age of 14, Hornby's father sent him to board at Marlborough College in Wiltshire, England. He later studied history and politics at the University of Edinburgh. At 19 years of age, Hornby interned as a runner at the Cogent Elliot agency. Upon graduation, He worked at the Ogilvy & Mather agency before moving to CDP in 1995, where he gained his first senior position.

== Career ==
=== The 2000s ===
After working at Ogilvy and CDP, Hornby became the managing director of the international advertising agency TBWA. Following a search co-ordinated by Labour backbencher Peter Mandelson TBWA won New Labour’s account and worked on Tony Blair's 2001 general election campaign. Hornby worked on the Labour Party's advertising campaign in the run-up to the 2001 UK general election. Following the campaign, which saw Blair re-elected with 413 seats, Hornby set about founding an agency with TBWA's former chief executive Simon Clemmow under the provisional title, Clemmow Hornby. Hornby offered Mandelson a role at his new agency in the hope that Mandelson's involvement might win other high-profile accounts. Later, after Charles Inge joined the firm, Clemmow, Hornby, and Inge combine their surnames to create the name CHI. Upon leaving TBWA, Hornby struck an agreement, allowing him to take one of TBWA's most valuable accounts, Sir Charles Dunstone, the former chairman of the mobile phone retailer, Carphone Warehouse. Dunstone allowed Hornby to run CHI from a loft above Carphone Warehouse's Marlybone Road shop in Northwest London, effectively enabling Hornby to create an agency with little or no start-up costs and one major client. By 2004 CHI had new offices in Wardour Street, Soho.

Following a string of successful pitches, the agency developed a client base ranging from drinks companies to financial services to radio stations. When Hornby came to sell a 49.9% stake in the company to Sir Martin Sorrell, he did so for £30 million. Following the deal, Hornby embarked on an acquisition spree.

=== The 2010s ===
Following his Sorrell deal and subsequent acquisition spree, Hornby added nine agencies to his portfolio and founded The&Partnership as a holdings company for his newly acquired agencies. He adopted a similar model to many law firms, whereby the partners are owners in the business and work together for a single profit and loss statement. By 2013, the company employed 1,400 people internationally, partly aided by Hornby's access to GroupM, the media buying arm of WPP plc, who at the time purchased approximately one-third of all British television advertising. Hornby remains the largest shareholder of the company, with a 22% stake.

=== Other work ===
After the former Carillion chairman, Philip Nevill Green stood down from Prince Harry's Sentebale charity in 2018, the anti-HIV non-profit announced Hornby as its new chairman. Hornby remained in that position until his resignation in July 2023.

== Personal life ==
The British author Nick Hornby is Hornby's half-brother. He is married to founder of ME+EM, Clare Hornby. The couple live in Oxfordshire with their two children.
