= Ambitious about Autism =

UK national charity

Coordinates: 51°35′12.61″N 0°09′02.33″W

- Founded: 1997
- Type: Registered Charity
- Purpose: Autism spectrum
- Location: Woodside Avenue, London, N10, UK
- Region served: United Kingdom
- Key people: Lord Tim Clement-Jones CBE, (President), Jolanta Lasota (Chief Executive)
- Website: ambitiousaboutautism.org.uk

Ambitious about Autism is a UK national charity for autistic children and young people. Its mission is to stand with autistic children and young people, champion their rights and create opportunities. Originally established in 1997 as the TreeHouse Trust, the charity was founded by a group of parents – including author Nick Hornby – who has an autistic son.

The charity runs specialist schools and colleges, provides a range of support services and plays a role in influencing UK Government policy.

It operates TreeHouse School in Muswell Hill, north London, Ambitious College which has campuses in Tottenham and West Thames, London, The Rise School, based in Feltham, west London, and Spring School in southwest London.

In September 2023, St. John’s College, a specialist college based in Brighton, joined the charity.

Ambitious about Autism also runs a national online youth network for autistic young people, an online community for parents and carers of autistic children and young people and a national employability programme.

== History ==
=== TreeHouse Trust ===
The charity was originally known as the TreeHouse Trust and began the school, with five pupils, in a borrowed room in the Royal Free Hospital in London. In 2004 the school moved to Muswell Hill also in London, and in 2009 moved into a purpose designed building – the Pears National Centre for Autism Education.

=== The Pears National Centre for Autism Education ===
Officially opened in 2009, the centre became home to both the TreeHouse School and the charity. It was designed by British architects Penoyre & Prasad who also designed the Richard Desmond Children's Eye Centre at Moorfields Eye Hospital. It was named for the Pears Foundation, a major supporter.

=== Ambitious about Autism ===
An event at the House of Lords on 10 February 2010 it was announced that TreeHouse Trust would be renamed Ambitious about Autism. In 2014 Ambitious about Autism expanded its specialist education services across London, opening Ambitious College and the Rise School.

Further expansion took place in 2023 when Spring School opened in London and the charity acquired St. John’s College in Brighton.

== Campaigning for change ==
In October 2011, the charity launched its 'Finished at School' campaign, which aimed to change the fact that less than one in four autistic children in the UK go on to further education and that 85% of adults with autism were unemployed. The campaign began with the launch of a self-named report, with a foreword by Robert Buckland MP subtitled "Where next for young people with autism?", it called for the British Government to create "A clear legal right to educational support up to the age of 25 years for young disabled people".

The Finished at School campaign was supported by an early day motion in the House of Commons entitled "That this House believes that young people with autism need more effective education options once they finish school in order to allow them to access work, live more independently and break the cycle of dependency; and supports the Finished at School campaign run by Ambitious about Autism...". 55 MPs signed in support of the motion.

In 2018, the charity launched a campaign called We Need An Education to raise awareness about the number of autistic children and young people missing from the UK's education system. The charity also commissioned a survey of parents and carers of autistic pupils, which found that a third of parents had been forced to give up their job after their children were excluded from school.

== Me, My Autism & I ==
In March 2023, during World Autism Acceptance Week, Ambitious about Autism launched a campaign in partnership with Vanish to raise awareness about autistic girls, who are three times less likely to receive an autism diagnosis than boys. The award-winning campaign also drew attention to sensory sensitivity in autistic people while raising money for the charity through a donation for each pack of selected Vanish products sold.

== Fundraising ==
There are a range of fundraising activities through which individuals and organisations raise money for Ambitious about Autism. These include the TCS London Marathon, and Night of Ambition, an annual fundraising gala.

Ambitious about Autism organises the annual 220 Manchester to London bike ride challenge in partnership with cycling clothing and accessories brand Rapha Racing Ltd.

== Employ Autism ==
According to the Office for National Statistics, 30% of autistic people are in full or part-time employment. The Employ Autism programme was set up in response to concerns about inequalities faced by autistic young people when trying to access employment.

== Ambitious Youth Network ==
The charity runs the Ambitious Youth Network which is an online space for autistic young people, between the ages of 13-25. The network offers autistic young people the opportunity to understand more about their autistic identity through peer-to-peer support.

== Talk about Autism ==
The charity runs the online autism community Talk about Autism as part of its mission to support parents and carers of autistic children and young people. There are thousands of active users who can connect with each other, share experiences and access information.

== Patrons ==
The following are Parent Patrons of the charity:

- Matthew Davis
- Keith Duffy
- Eliza Mishcon
- Charlotte Moore
- Claire Ryan
- Sophie Walker
- Nicky Clark

== Ambassadors ==
- Luke Treadaway
- Jon Snow
- Hayley Ronson
- David Mitchell
- Kathy Lette
- Jules Robertson
- Niamh Cusack
- Simon and Lucy Mottram
- Travis George
- Sam Holness

In December 2024, BBC presenter Gregg Wallace was dropped as an ambassador for the charity, which had appointed him in honour of his autistic son, in the light of the ongoing investigation of inappropriate behaviour during the making of the MasterChef series.

== Leadership ==
The charity's president is Lord Tim Clement-Jones CBE. He is supported by several vice-presidents, including Nick Hornby. The Chief Executive is Jolanta Lasota.

== See also ==
- List of autism organizations
