= Funny Woman =

Drama series on Sky

- Genre: Comedy drama
- Based on: Funny Girl by Nick Hornby
- Written by: Morwenna Banks
- Directed by: Oliver Parker
- Starring: Gemma Arterton; Arsher Ali; Tom Bateman; Matthew Beard; Leo Bill; Alexa Davies; Rosie Cavaliero; Morwenna Banks; David Threlfall; Rupert Everett
- Composer: Nainita Desai
- Country of origin: United Kingdom
- Original language: English
- No. of series: 2
- No. of episodes: 10

Production
- Executive producers: Gemma Arterton; Morwenna Banks; Andrea Calderwood; Gail Egan; Tilusha Ghelani; Nick Hornby; Jessica Malik; Jon Mountague; Jessica Parker
- Cinematography: Matthew Wicks
- Running time: 46–47 minutes

Original release
- Network: Sky Max
- Release: 9 February 2023 – 27 September 2024

Funny Woman is a British comedy drama television series directed by Oliver Parker and adapted for the screen by Morwenna Banks from the best-selling novel Funny Girl by Nick Hornby. It stars Gemma Arterton in the lead role and premiered on 9 February 2023 on Sky Max. In August 2023, it was renewed for a second series, which premiered on 6 September 2024.

== Premise ==
The series follows Barbara Parker (stage name Sophie Straw), a Blackpool beauty queen who becomes a comedy star in the male-dominated sitcom industry in 1960s London.

== Cast and characters ==
- Gemma Arterton as Barbara Parker / Sophie Straw (S1, S2)
- Arsher Ali as Dennis Mahindra (S1, S2)
- Matthew Beard as Bill Gardiner (S1, S2)
- Leo Bill as Tony Holmes (S1, S2)
- Alexa Davies as Marjorie "Marj" Harrison (S1, S2)
- Clare-Hope Ashitey as Diane Lewis (S1, S2)
- Rosie Cavaliero as Marie Parker (S1, S2)
- Alistair Petrie as Ted Sargent (S1, S2)
- Emily Bevan as Edith Mahindra (S1, S2)
- Olivia Williams as Gloria (S1, S2)
- Morwenna Banks as Patsy Debenham (S1, S2)
- David Threlfall as George Parker (S1, S2)
- Doon Mackichan as Miss Sykes (S1, S2)
- Tom Bateman as Clive Richardson (S1)
- Rupert Everett as Brian Debenham (S1)
- Steve Zissis as Marc Allen (S2)
- Marcus Rutherford as Roger (S2)

The show includes fictionalised portrayals of personalities from the period, including Frankie Howerd (Robert Forknall), Eleanor Bron (Emma Humpston), Val Doonican (Mike Prior), Spike Milligan (Alexander Jonas) and John Fortune (Nathan Chatelier).

== Episodes ==
Series	Episodes	Originally released	
Series	Episodes	First released	Last released
1	6	9 February 2023	16 March 2023
2	4	6 September 2024	27 September 2024

=== Series 1 (2023) ===
No. overall	No. in series	Title	Directed by	Written by	Original release date
1	1	"Episode 1"	Oliver Parker	Morwenna Banks	9 February 2023
2	2	"Episode 2"	Oliver Parker	Morwenna Banks	16 February 2023
3	3	"Episode 3"	Oliver Parker	Morwenna Banks	23 February 2023
4	4	"Episode 4"	Oliver Parker	Morwenna Banks	2 March 2023
5	5	"Episode 5"	Oliver Parker	Morwenna Banks	9 March 2023
6	6	"Episode 6"	Oliver Parker	Morwenna Banks	16 March 2023

=== Series 2 (2024) ===
No. overall	No. in series	Title	Directed by	Written by	Original release date
7	1	"Episode 1"	Oliver Parker	Morwenna Banks	6 September 2024
8	2	"Episode 2"	Oliver Parker	Morwenna Banks	13 September 2024
9	3	"Episode 3"	Oliver Parker	Kevin Cecil; Andy Riley	20 September 2024
10	4	"Episode 4"	Oliver Parker	Morwenna Banks	27 September 2024

== Broadcast ==
The first series premiered on 9 February 2023 on Sky Max, with all six episodes also available on Now. In August 2023, it was renewed for a second series which premiered on 6 September 2024.

== Reception ==
Seventy-three percent of critics reviews for Funny Woman are positive on review aggregator Rotten Tomatoes. It received mixed reviews in the press on the grounds that the title caused some to believe it was intended as a comedy rather than a drama about a comedy actress. This led to reviews of a "mediocre" and "uneven" series. Meanwhile, Funny Woman received three-, four- and five-star reviews from other reviewers, including The Guardian, who considered Arterton's performance "absolutely captivating", and The Independent, who felt "this show feels like a warm hug" with a "plucky, bold heroine". The Upcoming praised Arterton's "flirtatious, witty and charismatic" performance and considered Funny Woman "fast, fluid and incredibly clever".
