= Ministry of Stories =

The Ministry of Stories is a non-profit organisation based in Hoxton, London dedicated to helping children and young adults develop writing skills and to helping teachers inspire their students to write.

== Overview ==
Located in Hoxton, a district in the London Borough of Hackney, England, The Ministry of Stories was founded in 2010 by the British author Nick Hornby and co-directors Lucy Macnab and Ben Payne. The company provides free after school writing labs to local children and young people, supported by volunteer writers, teachers and artists. MoS aims to inspire young people to transform their lives through creative writing. The charity works out of their writing centre on Kingsland road providing a space for children to explore their imaginations, writing, performace and develop social and educational confidence.

As of late 2012, 5,000 young people have taken part in activities sponsored by the MoS. About 500 trained volunteers have contributed to the effort, as have writers including Joe Dunthorne, David Nicholls and Zadie Smith, as well as actors Colin Firth and Emma Thompson.

The MoS is patterned after Dave Eggers' 826 Valencia, founded in 2002 in San Francisco.

The MoS receives funding from the Arts Council England.

In 2026, after 15 years on Hoxton Street, Ministry of Stories relocated to North Stables, 138 Kingsland road, London, E2 8DY to "create an even bigger and bolder writing centre that will welcome hundreds more young writers."

== Hoxton Street Monster Supplies ==
The original Ministry of Stories on Hoxton Street was located behind its shop, Hoxton Street Monster Supplies. A sweets and oddities shop selling Fang Floss, jars of Human Snot and cans marked Creeping Dread and Escalating Panic.

Hoxton Street Monster Supplies closed its doors permanently in July 2026 when the charity moved to North Stables, 138 Kingsland road where they have more space to run their free after school community writing clubs.
