= Derek Hornby =

British business executive (1930 – 2013)

- Born: Derek Peter Hornby; 10 January 1930; Bournemouth
- Died: 16 December 2013 (aged 83)
- Occupation: Business executive

Sir Derek Peter Hornby (10 January 1930 – 16 December 2013) was a British business executive who was chairman of London and Continental Railways.

Hornby was born in Bournemouth and attended Canford School in Dorset. He was twice married, firstly to Margaret (née Withers) then to Sonia (née Beesley).

His four children include the novelist Nick Hornby, the businessman Johnny Hornby, and Gill, who married the author Robert Harris. Hornby was knighted in 1990.
