= Clare Hornby =

English businesswoman

Clare Hornby OBE (née Griffiths; born 1969) is an English businesswoman. She is the founder and CEO of ME+EM.

== Early life and education ==
Clare Hornby was born in Oldham, Lancashire to Tony and Pam Griffiths. Her father was a joiner and her mother was a primary school teacher. After attending Saddleworth Secondary School, Hornby earned a degree in Retail Marketing from Manchester Polytechnic (currently Manchester Metropolitan University).

== Career ==
Hornby started her first business at the age of 14 selling second-hand shoes in Oldham market. After graduating, she moved to London and began her career at Harrods on the graduate scheme. When she was 22, Hornby got her first job in advertising at Mojo Agency, which led her to move to Sydney, Australia for 18 months, before returning to London and joining the agency HHCL & Partners.

In 2007, Hornby co-founded Pyjama Room alongside Emma Howarth. Pyjama Room was a womenswear brand offering luxury loungewear essentials.

In 2009 Hornby and Howarth made the decision to evolve the product into a ready-to-wear collection and relaunch the business as ME+EM. After Howarth left the business in 2012, Hornby remained as the brand's CEO.

Hornby maintains a significant stake in ME+EM, after the business received investment from Highland Europe in 2022.

In April 2026, ME+EM was awarded a Royal Warrant by Queen Camilla.

In June 2026, ME+EM Founder and CEO Clare Hornby was awarded an OBE for services to the fashion industry. She was named in The King's Birthday Honours List, which was published on 12 June.

== Other work ==
In 2020, Hornby was made an ambassador for the King's Trust Women Supporting Women initiative.

== Personal life ==
Clare is married to businessman Johnny Hornby, and has two daughters and three stepchildren. The couple splits their time between London and Oxfordshire.
