= Fever Pitch (2005 film) =

2005 American romantic comedy-drama film

- Theatrical release poster
- Directed by: Peter Farrelly; Bobby Farrelly
- Screenplay by: Lowell Ganz; Babaloo Mandel
- Based on: Fever Pitch by Nick Hornby
- Produced by: Amanda Posey; Alan Greenspan; Gil Netter; Drew Barrymore; Nancy Juvonen; Bradley Thomas
- Starring: Drew Barrymore; Jimmy Fallon
- Cinematography: Matthew F. Leonetti
- Edited by: Alan Baumgarten
- Music by: Craig Armstrong
- Production companies: Fox 2000 Pictures; Flower Films; Wildgaze Films
- Distributed by: 20th Century Fox
- Release dates: April 6, 2005 (Boston); April 8, 2005 (United States)
- Running time: 104 minutes
- Country: United States
- Language: English
- Budget: $30 million
- Box office: $50.6 million

Fever Pitch (released as The Perfect Catch outside North America) is a 2005 American romantic comedy-drama film directed by the Farrelly brothers. It stars Drew Barrymore and Jimmy Fallon and is a remake of the British 1997 film of the same title. Nick Hornby, who had written the original 1992 book and the 1997 screenplay adaptation, acted as an executive producer for the American remake.

While both the book and the original 1997 film are about association football, the 2005 adaptation, aimed specifically at the American market, is about baseball. Both Fever Pitch films feature real-life dramatic sporting victories, the original focusing on Arsenal's last-minute League title win in the final game of the 1988–1989 season, and the remake on the Boston Red Sox's World Series Championship in 2004, unanticipated while the film was in production.

The film premiered in Boston on April 6, 2005 and was released by 20th Century Fox on April 8, 2005, in the United States, with Inside the CIA, a promotional short film for American Dad!, premiering with it. It received mixed reviews from critics and grossed $50.6 million against a $30 million budget.

== Plot ==
In 1980, 7-year-old Ben Wrightman had just moved to Boston with his mother after his parents' divorce. His uncle Carl took him to a Boston Red Sox game at Fenway Park to cheer him up. From that day on, he was a die-hard Red Sox fan for life.

23 years later, Ben is still in Boston, working as a school teacher, and has inherited his uncle's season tickets since his death from cancer. Almost all of his possessions bear the Red Sox logo (except for his toilet paper, which is of the New York Yankees). On a school trip, Ben meets Lindsey Meeks, a successful, dedicated corporate executive, and they begin dating.

Lindsey, who knows little about baseball or the Red Sox, learns about the Curse of the Bambino from Ben's stadium friends (including Al Waterman, a sponge salesman who also narrates the story). They continue attending the games together, but tension arises when Lindsey is up for a promotion and begins working on her laptop during the game. Lindsey is knocked unconscious by a line drive foul and recovers but stops going to the games, suggesting Ben will have more fun if he goes with his friends.

Things get worse when Lindsey invites Ben to accompany her to Paris, and he declines because the Red Sox are in the heat of the pennant race. Before leaving, she tells Ben she might be pregnant. She expresses concern that he is more committed to the Red Sox than her, and days later, she calls him and confirms she isn't pregnant.

To prove he is not obsessed, Ben misses a game against the Yankees to escort Lindsey to her friend's birthday party. Ben and Lindsey enjoy the party, and after making love, he tells her it was one of the best nights of his life. Moments later, he gets an ecstatic call from his friend Troy, who tells him the Red Sox overcame a seven-run deficit in the bottom of the ninth to pull off one of the greatest comebacks in team history. Ben becomes irate that he missed such a historic Red Sox moment, blaming Lindsey for making him miss the game. She is heartbroken, and they break up.

Ben soon misses Lindsey and visits her in an attempt to reconcile. Lindsey thinks he's only there because the Sox are about to be eliminated and rejects Ben. He then plans to sell his season tickets to prove she means more to him than the Red Sox. Lindsey finds out during the celebration for her much-anticipated promotion and rushes to stop him. She buys a scalped outfield ticket and, during the 9th inning of the Red Sox–Yankees playoff game, when the Red Sox are just 3 outs away from being swept. Ben is in the stands, about to finalize the ticket sale.

Meanwhile, Lindsey drops over the outfield wall and runs across the field and around players to avoid security. She reaches Ben, tears up the contract, and tells him that if he loves her enough to sell his seats, then she loves him enough not to let him do it. They kiss in front of the entire crowd before Lindsey is arrested.

Al narrates the epilogue: the Red Sox won that game and then beat the Yankees three more times to win the American League pennant, later sweeping the National League champion St. Louis Cardinals for their first World Series title in 86 years. Lindsay and Ben travel to Busch Stadium in St. Louis for the decisive Game 4. Eventually, they marry, and Lindsey conceives a "player to be named later". Al explains that the baby will be named Ted Williams Wrightman if it's a boy, "Carla Yastrzemski" Wrightman if it's a girl, adding, "Let's all hope for a boy."

A post-credit scene shows a group of children (presumably, the children of Ben and Lindsey and their friends) chanting "LET'S GO, RED SOX!".

== Cast ==
- Drew Barrymore as Lindsey Meeks
- Jimmy Fallon as Benjamin "Ben" Wrightman
  - Jason Spevack as 7-year-old Benjamin "Ben" Wrightman in 1980
- James B. Sikking as Doug Meeks
- JoBeth Williams as Maureen Meeks
- Willie Garson as Kevin
- Evan Helmuth as Troy
- Siobhan Fallon Hogan as Lana Wrightman
- Jack Kehler as Al Waterman
- Armando Riesco as Gerard
- Ione Skye as Molly
- Johnny Sneed as Chris
- KaDee Strickland as Robin
- Marissa Jaret Winokur as Sarah
- Scott H. Severance as Artie
- Lenny Clarke as Uncle Carl
- Zen Gesner as Steve
- Jackie Burroughs as Mrs. Warren
- Stephen King as himself
- Kris Williams as herself
- Steve Levy as himself
- Brett Murphy as Ryan
- Andrew Wilson as Grant Wade / Patrick Lyons

Several Boston Red Sox personnel make appearances in the film, including: players Johnny Damon, Trot Nixon, Jason Varitek and Jim Rice, and announcers Joe Castiglione, Don Orsillo and Dennis Eckersley.

== Production ==
The original plot had assumed the Red Sox would lose in the playoffs. However, the Red Sox stunned the baseball world when they won four straight games to win the 2004 ALCS against the rival Yankees (becoming the first MLB team to overcome a 3–0 series deficit) and subsequent World Series against the St. Louis Cardinals to break the "Curse of the Bambino". Thus, the ending had to be rewritten. On the day of Game 4, with the Red Sox on the verge of a sweep, the Farrellys decided to bring Barrymore, Fallon, and a film crew to St. Louis hours before the first pitch — and Barrymore and Fallon attended the game at Busch Stadium in character. When the Red Sox made the final out to secure a 4–0 win over the Cardinals that broke the Curse, Fox cameras on the live broadcast caught Barrymore and Fallon, as Lindsey and Ben, running onto the field and kissing to celebrate. The film, with its updated ending, was also screened at Fenway Park the following August on a screen in center field.

Originally, Shawn Levy, who was a huge fan of Nick Hornby's works for years, was attached to direct, with Gwyneth Paltrow playing Lindsey. However, Paltrow found the script mediocre and turned down the role. Brian Robbins replaced Levy, but he quit the project as well. After Drew Barrymore replaced Paltrow and Jimmy Fallon joined the cast, Jay Russell, P. J. Hogan, Luke Greenfield, and Mira Nair were all rumored candidates to direct until the studios hired the Farrelly brothers.

== Reception ==
=== Critical response ===
On Rotten Tomatoes, the film holds an approval rating 66% based on 195 reviews, with an average rating of 6.3/10. The site's critical consensus reads: "While not a home run, Fever Pitch has enough charm and on-screen chemistry between the two leads to make it a solid hit." On Metacritic, the film has a weighted average score of 56 out of 100, based on 37 critics, indicating "mixed or average" reviews. Audiences surveyed by CinemaScore gave the film an average grade of "A−" on an A+ to F scale.

The film, and especially its script, received some praise from critics Roger Ebert and James Berardinelli.

=== Box office ===
The film opened at No. 3 and grossed $12.4 million in its opening weekend. The final North American gross of the film was $42.1 million, and the worldwide gross was $50.5 million.

== Home media ==
Fever Pitch was released on DVD and VHS on September 13, 2005.

== Soundtrack ==
Fever Pitch: Music from the Motion Picture

Soundtrack album by Various Artists
- Released: April 26, 2005
- Length: 54:23
- Label: BulletProof Music/Rykodisc

1. The Standells – "Dirty Water"
2. Dropkick Murphys – "Tessie"
3. Tears for Fears – "Who Killed Tangerine?"
4. Popium – "Sooner or Later"
5. Ivy – "Thinking About You"
6. Nick Drake – "Northern Sky"
7. Marah – "My Heart Is the Bums on the Street"
8. Steve Wynn – "Second Best"
9. The J. Geils Band – "Whammer Jammer" (Live Version)
10. The Human League – "(Keep Feeling) Fascination"
11. Chic – "Dance, Dance, Dance (Yowsah, Yowsah, Yowsah)"
12. Joe Pernice – "Moonshot Manny"
13. Jonathan Richman – "As We Walk to Fenway Park in Boston Town"
14. Mad Larry – "Window Pane"
15. Hurricane Smith – "Oh, Babe, What Would You Say?"

== See also ==
- List of baseball films

== Bibliography ==
- Fever Pitch. Baseball Movie Guide. Archived from the original on January 11, 2008.
