= Timothy Clement-Jones, Baron Clement-Jones =

British politician (born 1949)

The Right Honourable The Lord Clement-Jones CBE FRSA
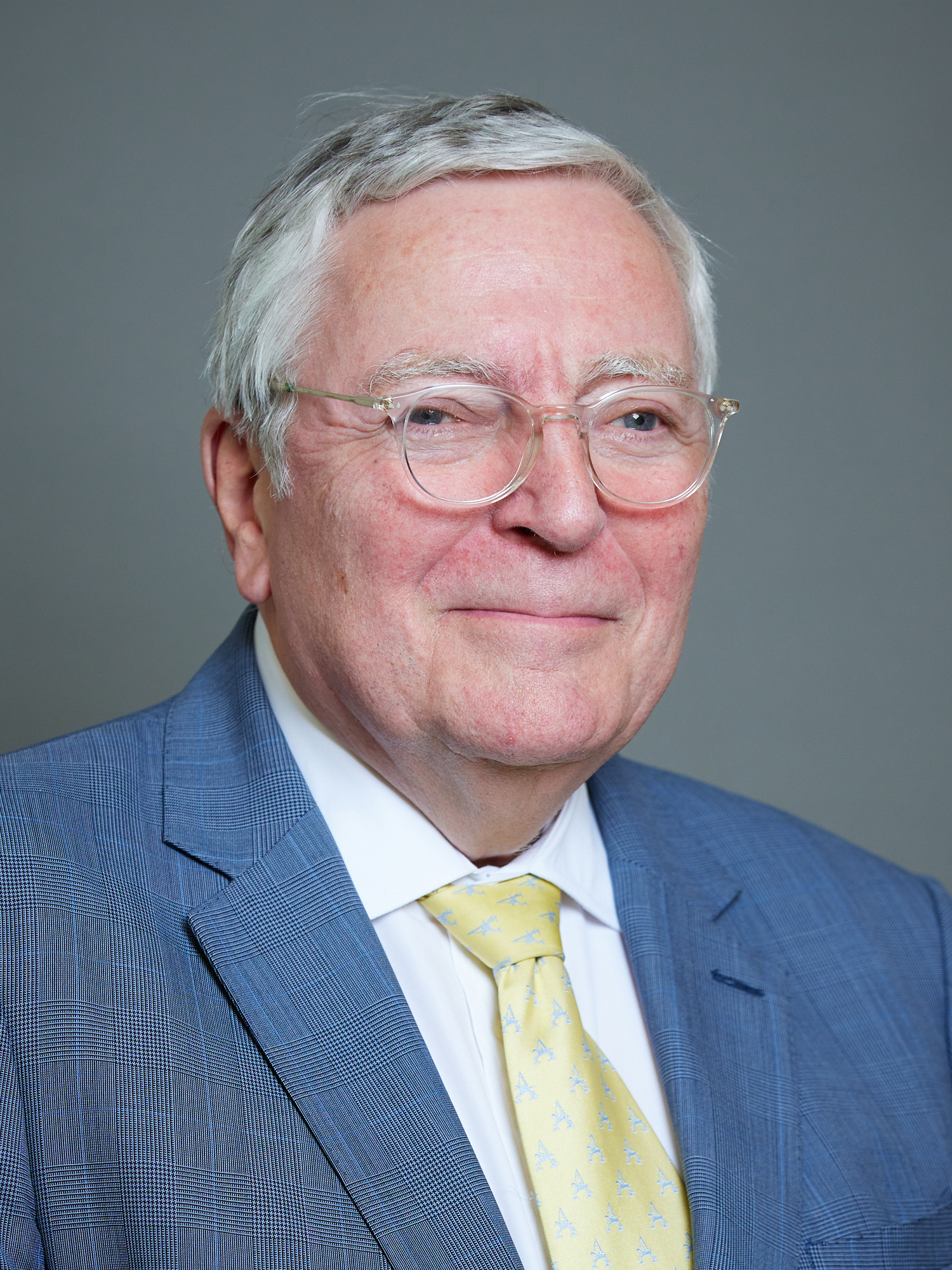
- Official portrait, 2022

Chairman of the Liberal Party
- In office 1986 – 2 March 1988
- Preceded by: Paul Tyler
- Succeeded by: Party Dissolved

Member of the House of Lords
- Lord Temporal
- Life peerage 17 July 1998

Personal details
- Born: 26 October 1949 (age 77)
- Party: Liberal Party; Liberal Democrats

Timothy Francis Clement-Jones, Baron Clement-Jones, CBE, FRSA (born 26 October 1949) is a Liberal Democrat peer and spokesman for the digital economy in the House of Lords.

== Career ==
Clement-Jones is a consultant of the multinational law firm DLA Piper, and formerly held positions as London managing partner (2011–2016), head of UK government affairs, chairman of its China and Middle East Desks, international business relations partner, and co-chairman of global government relations.

Clement-Jones held senior legal positions at London Weekend Television (now part of ITV plc, 1980–1983) and Grand Metropolitan (now Diageo plc, 1984–1986). He was group company secretary and legal adviser of Kingfisher plc from 1986 until 1995, where he coordinated Kingfisher's contribution to the Shopping Hours Reform Campaign which led to the Sunday Trading Act 1994. From 1996 to 1999, he was director of Political Context, a political communications consultancy. Clement-Jones was a non-executive chairman of the environmental strategy and communications consultancy Context Group from 1997 to 2005.

Clement-Jones has served as a member of the following organizations:

- Ombudsman Services Limited – chair
- Association of Insurance and Risk Managers in Industry and Commerce (Airmic) – advisory board member
- Institute of Chartered Accountants in England and Wales (ICAEW) – Corporate Finance Faculty board member
- Saudi British Joint Business Council – member
- City of London – Law Society Ambassador
- 48 Group Club – Icebreaker Fellow and vice president
- Authors' Licensing and Collecting Society - chair (2025 to present)

=== Political career ===
Clement-Jones was chairman of the Association of Liberal Lawyers from 1982 to 1986, and then of the Liberal Party from 1986 to 1988. He played a major part in the merger with the Social Democratic Party to form the Liberal Democrats. He was made CBE for political services in 1988. He was the chairman of the Liberal Democrats Finance Committee from 1989 to 1998 and federal treasurer of the Liberal Democrats from 2005 to 2010.

Clement-Jones was made a life peer taking the title Baron Clement-Jones, of Clapham in the London Borough of Lambeth on 17 July 1998 and until July 2004 was the Liberal Democrat health spokesman, and thereafter until 2010 Liberal Democrat spokesman on culture, media and sport, in the House of Lords. Since 2012, he has been the chair of Lib Dems in Communications. He is the Liberal Democrat spokesman for the digital economy and a former spokesman on the creative industries (2015–2017).

He was a member of the Select Committees on Communications (2011–2015) and the Built Environment (2015–2016). From 2017 to 2018 he was chair of the House of Lords Select Committee on Artificial Intelligence. He is co-chairman of the All-Party Parliamentary Group on Artificial Intelligence. He is deputy chairman of the All-Party Parliamentary Group on China and vice chairman of the All-Party Parliamentary Groups for Iraqi-Kurdistan, Ovarian Cancer, Publishing, Writers and Intellectual Property.

He introduced and ensured the passage through the House of Lords of the 2003 Tobacco and Advertising and Sponsorship Act and the Live Music Act 2012.

=== Other associations ===
He is honorary president of Ambitious about Autism (formerly Treehouse), an autism education charity and school for children with autism and other communication disorders, and its former chairman (2001–2008). Until its merger with Macmillan Cancer Support in 2008, he was a trustee of Cancerbackup, the UK cancer information charity founded by his late wife, Vicky Clement-Jones. Clement Jones has also served in the following positions:

- Council chair, Queen Mary University of London
- Council chair, School of Pharmacy, University of London (2008–2012)
- External council member, University College London
- Chair of audit committee, University College London (2012–2017)
- Advisory board member, UCL Medical School
- Fellow, UCL School of Pharmacy
- Council member, Heart of the City
- Fellow, Public Relations Consultants Association
- Honorary fellow, Chartered Institute of Public Relations
- Governor, Haileybury and Imperial Service College
- Ambassador, Barts Charity
- Trustee, Barbican Centre Trust (2012–2016)
- Chair, Crime Concern (1991–1995)

== Personal life ==
He is the son of Maurice Llewelyn Clement-Jones and (Margaret) Jean, née Hudson. He received his education at Haileybury and Imperial Service College and Trinity College, Cambridge (economics). In 1973, he married Vicky Veronica Yip, who died in 1987. He married Jean Roberta Whiteside in 1994.

== Arms ==
Coat of arms of Timothy Clement-Jones, Baron Clement-Jones

Adopted
2008
Coronet
Coronet of a Baron
Crest
Upon a helm with a wreath Argent and Sable a lion sejant Sable grasping in the dexter forepaw a fleur-de-lys per pale Argent and Or
Escutcheon
Sable an orle fracted and there conjoined to two chevronels couped all per pale Or and Argent three fleurs-de-lys that in dexter chief Argent that in sinister chief Or and that in base per pale Argent and Or the chevronels enclosing a chevron couped per pale Argent and Or.
Motto
Fide Et Diligentia (Faith and diligence)
Symbolism
These armorial bearings were granted with an extension of limitation to be placed on a monument or otherwise displayed in memory of his grandfather and to be borne and used by the grantee and his descendants and the other descendants of his said grandfather. The grantee's family had long used a chevron between three fleurs-de-lys and the crest of a demi lion rampant. Being unable to prove entitlement to these arms and crest, it was deemed desirable to have a new grant which demonstrates that the chevron formation combined with fleurs-de-lys is still possible. Similarly, the lion and fleurs-de-lys may be considered two charges heavily over used in the past. Nonetheless a relatively simple crest, combining these two charges, can be obtained.

== See also ==
- House of Lords

Party political offices
Preceded by Paul Tyler	Chairman of the Liberal Party; 1986–1988	Party merged into Social Liberal Democrats
Preceded by Reg Clark	Liberal Democrat Treasurer; 2005–2010	Succeeded by Richard Duncalf
Orders of precedence in the United Kingdom
Preceded by The Lord Mackenzie of Framwellgate	Gentlemen; Baron Clement-Jones	Followed by The Lord Alli
