= Spex (magazine) =

German rock and pop culture magazine

- Cover of Spex No. 321 (July/August 2009)
- Categories: Music and pop culture magazine
- Frequency: Bi-monthly
- Total circulation: 21,249 (2008)
- Founded: 1980
- Final issue Number: 27 December 2018; 385
- Company: Piranha Media GmbH
- Country: Germany
- Based in: Berlin
- Language: German
- Website: spex.de
- ISSN: 0178-6830
- OCLC: 85123144

Spex was a German rock and pop culture magazine located in Berlin, Germany. Besides music news, Spex also covered literature, cinema, fashion and contemporary social trends. Since January 2008, Spex was headquartered in Berlin and included an audio CD.

== History ==
=== The foundation ===
The paper's first issue was published in Cologne in 1980 by a small group of writers who decided to found their own music paper: they were Gerald Hündgen, Clara Drechsler, Dirk Scheuring, Wilfried Rütten and Peter Bömmels. They first considered naming it 555 but finally pitched on Spex – which means "glasses" in English slang. The name Spex reminds of the then very famous punk band X-Ray Spex. The magazine was initially distributed in record stores and railway stations. The articles were not as elaborate as those in comparable magazines, as the objective was to present new young artists. Four issues were published in the first year. Spex turned monthly in 1981. In 1983 its main competitor, Sounds, closed down. That paper addressed very modern artists and tendencies like punk, new wave and the German new wave. Most of its editorial team was hired to work for Spex, like Diedrich Diederichsen (forthcoming editor) or Olaf Dante Marx. The articles took a new turn, more theoretical and more literary.

=== The fame ===
Around 1983, Spex gained recognition as a major music magazine thanks to the quality of its editorial line, competing with British music magazines such as the New Musical Express or The Face. The magazine's strength was to focus on pop music in the context of pop culture, while still covering social and political issues in a humorous and ironic tone. Some Spex writers saw their profile rise as they started writing opinions columns, such as Diedrich Diederichsen, Rainald Goetz, or Clara Drechsler's editorials, which earned her comparisons to Julie Burchill. Spex is not only a platform for new authors but also for new trends. One of the first publications to put Madonna on their cover (November 1983), the magazine also opens its pages to debate on contemporary technical and social issues such as "girlism".

However, because of its huge freedom Spex was inclined to speak only about topics that interested the editorial team, and to ignore other newsworthy trends. Some good artists were rejected on principle. The Smiths, for example, never appealed to Spex, whereas Die Toten Hosen have always been the object of graceful praises. Diedrich Diederichsen, the editor from 1985 to 1991, brought the spotlight on American indie punk bands (predominantly from the SST Records) at the expense of other kinds of pop music like house or hip hop. At the end of the year 1999, after nineteen years of existence, Spex went bankrupt and was bought by Piranha Media. This signalled the end of self-production and the magazine was completely restructured as many employees chose to leave. Critics saw the buy-out as a loss of Spex's independence and predicted that it would become a mouthpiece of the music industry.

=== The removal ===
In December 2006, parent company Piranha Media announced the relocation of the editorial staff from Cologne to Berlin. Editor Alex Lacher claimed it was necessary for practical reasons (being closer to the music industry in Berlin), and for financial reasons: the loss in revenue caused by the prohibition of tobacco advertising in German newspapers obligated them to close one of their three editorial offices (Berlin, Cologne, and Munich). This decision has sometimes been seen as a pretext taken by Piranha to get rid of the editorial staff. The move, first planned in the summer of 2006, was carried out in December; the Cologne staff who resisted the move were fired after the publication of the January 2007 issue. Max Dax was named as the new editor and Spex settled in the Kreuzberg neighbourhood, where Groove, a Piranha publication dedicated to techno music, was already located.

=== The new Spex ===
In March 2007, the first issue of the new Spex from Berlin came out. At that time, the paper became bi-monthly. This choice was driven by the in-depth transformation of the magazine's content and the decision to emphasise analysis of wider musical and artistic trends over news coverage. Spex is no longer focused on listing new releases, but also on critical analysis of modern social evolutions. It has more pages, longer articles, and fewer but more detailed record reviews. The conditions of the production of art are a topic of interest, with special reports on globalisation, the rise of digital culture, depolitisation and the difficulties of the music industry. There are many reasons for those editorial changes. In the last years of the Cologne period, readers complained about a degradation of the editorial quality, claiming that the magazine was losing its trademark wit and just compiling record reviews indifferently every month. In that sense, Spex was no longer a voice distinct from other music magazines such as Intro, Uncle Sally or Musikexpress. In addition, the financial difficulties of the music industry, meaning declining ad buy figures, might have decided Spex to diversify the subjects covered. Today, Spex in Berlin has outgrown the initial difficulties, with a solid financial situation and positive feedback from its readers and peers: with an 18,400 circulation in early 2007, it grew to 21,349 copies one year later, a 14% raise. (source : (IVW)).

In issue #383 released on 15 October 2018 it was announced that the issue to be published on 27 December 2018 would be the last number.
