= Speaking with the Angel =

2000 short story anthology

- First edition
- Editor: Nick Hornby
- Author: Various
- Cover artist: Archie Ferguson
- Language: English
- Genre: Anthology
- Publisher: Penguin Books
- Publication date: 2000
- Publication place: United Kingdom
- Media type: Print
- Pages: 233 pp
- ISBN: 978-0-1402-9678-5
- OCLC: 883583277

Speaking with the Angel is an anthology of short stories edited by Nick Hornby. It was initially published by Penguin Books in 2000. Featuring stories from twelve established writers, the book acted as a fundraising effort for TreeHouse, a charity school for severely autistic children in London where Hornby's son was a student.

== Contents ==
- "Introduction" by Nick Hornby
- "PMQ" by Robert Harris
- "The Wonder Spot" by Melissa Bank
- "Last Requests" by Giles Smith
- "Peter Shelley" by Patrick Marber
- "The Department of Nothing" by Colin Firth
- "I'm the Only One" by Zadie Smith
- "NippleJesus" by Nick Hornby
- "After I Was Thrown in the River and Before I Drowned" by Dave Eggers
- "LuckyBitch" by Helen Fielding
- "The Slave" by Roddy Doyle
- "Catholic Guilt" by Irvine Welsh
- "Walking into the Wind" by John O'Farrell
