= Fever Pitch (1997 film) =

- UK theatrical release poster
- Directed by: David Evans
- Screenplay by: Nick Hornby
- Based on: Fever Pitch: A Fan's Life by Nick Hornby
- Produced by: Amanda Posey
- Starring: Colin Firth; Ruth Gemmell; Neil Pearson; Lorraine Ashbourne; Mark Strong; Holly Aird; Ken Stott
- Cinematography: Chris Seager
- Edited by: Scott Thomas
- Music by: Boo Hewerdine; Neil MacColl
- Production company: Channel 4 Films
- Distributed by: FilmFour Distributors
- Release date: 4 April 1997
- Running time: 102 minutes
- Country: United Kingdom
- Language: English

Fever Pitch is a 1997 film starring Colin Firth and Ruth Gemmell, based loosely on Nick Hornby's best-selling memoir, Fever Pitch: A Fan's Life (1992).

Hornby adapted the book for the screen and fictionalised the story, concentrating on Arsenal's First Division championship-winning season in 1988–89 and its effect on the protagonist's romantic relationship. Firth plays Paul Ashworth, the character based on Hornby, a teacher at a school in Muswell Hill, north London, and his romance with Sarah Hughes (Ruth Gemmell), a new teacher who joins Ashworth's school. The film culminates with the real life events of Arsenal's match against title rivals Liverpool in the final game of the season on 26 May 1989, with a last-minute goal by Michael Thomas giving Arsenal the 2–0 win they needed to secure the title.

== Plot ==
In 1988, Paul Ashworth is an English teacher where new history teacher Sarah Hughes has just started. From the first day of class, they clash. His classroom is lively and boisterous, chanting for Arsenal, which she says distracts her students.

Sarah complains about him to her flatmate Jo, who jokingly says they will "end up shagging". Paul talks about her to his friend Steve, saying that although she is pretty, they mutually hate one another. Steve suggests it is a "promising sign".

Paul's childhood is depicted through flashbacks as his dad, who he only sees sporadically as his parents are divorced, tries to connect with his children. Initially uninterested, when he is taken to a match, he loves the whole rowdy, lively experience.

In the present, Robert from the school team Paul coaches asks him to take him to a match, which he declines. Discussing him with his mother, she is concerned. Paul says that, although he has poor penmanship, he is doing fine in his class. He suggests she take him to the next match as she is separated from his dad, to cheer him up.

After Parents Day, Paul offers Sarah a lift home as it is raining. She complains that, although she had prepared, the parents preferred talking to him over her. Sarah invites him up and, as Jo is not home, they have sex, beginning a relationship.

When they have been together over six months, Sarah suggests they plan a trip somewhere. She offers to write suggested dates into his diary, but Paul is reluctant as he does not have the next season's football fixture list yet. Sarah remarks that this indicates that he is not sure he will be with her in the future, but knows he will be supporting Arsenal. He counters that it's no different to her knowing she'll see her sister next season. Sarah points out that sisters "don't have seasons".

Nevertheless, Sarah finds herself influenced by Paul and gradually drawn into an interest in football, and so she goes with him to see an Arsenal match. The shoving and fanaticism she experiences makes her nervous. When it is discovered that over 70 fans were crushed to death at another match that same day, Sarah is incredulous that it does not dissuade Paul from attending matches in future.

Sarah then discovers she is pregnant and is unsure of what she wants to do. Paul is enthusiastic and declares they will have to marry and have the baby, but she fears he would not be available for the long haul.

Paul is offered the position of Head of Year, which he is not initially interested in, but now facing increased obligations, he tells the headmaster he has changed his mind about the promotion. The headmaster is pleased until Paul tells him about being with Sarah and the upcoming baby, which the headmaster says sets a bad example to pupils.

Paul does not get the job. Arsenal lose an important game, weakening their chances of winning the title. Sarah comes over to offer sympathy over the interview, but the Arsenal loss is what is upsetting him. She says "it's only a game" which makes Paul very angry, as he has never cared about anything more. They argue and she leaves, their relationship seemingly over.

The school's big football championship final comes. Robert misses a penalty kick and loses the match. Paul asks him if he had the choice between success in this match or a positive outcome of the Arsenal-Liverpool league championship contest, what would he decide; his answer is the latter. So Paul suggests he focus on the bigger game, consoling him by humorously suggesting he had "done his bit" by missing a penalty.

Just before the match that will decide the title in Liverpool, Sarah checks in with Paul. Unsure if she will be able to see it, she wishes them luck, knowing the team must win by two goals. He reveals that he has resigned from his teaching post, as he needs to seek better pay elsewhere and considers it untenable that they remain colleagues with him the estranged father of her child.

Everyone who is watching the match on TV is very nervous. Paul complains to Steve that it is "too depressing" to watch as Arsenal are sure to fail, and suggests he will leave the flat, but then cannot tear himself away.

Even Sarah discovers the team is 1-0 up, sneaking a look while at a house party with her students. She leaves and grabs a taxi to Paul's, arriving at his door with one minute of the match remaining. Sarah's buzzing up at such an inopportune moment earns her a myriad of profanity out of the window, as Paul shouts out that the interruption comes at the worst occasion of his life.

Suddenly realising it could be Sarah, Paul runs down to catch her, but she has gone. Hurrying back upstairs, he just manages to see the winning goal scored in the final moments of the match. It being the first time the club had won the league after an 18-year-drought, the area comes alive with celebrations, as excited Arsenal fans pour into the streets. The initially saddened Sarah gets swept away by the wave of supporters. Meanwhile, Paul and Steve also celebrate, Paul now trying to assure Steve that he never lost faith that Arsenal would win.

Paul and Sarah find each other in the street amongst the crowds and kiss, instantly rekindling their relationship. From then on, he moves on with his life with her. Paul states that his happiness is no longer dependent on Arsenal.

== Cast ==
- Colin Firth as Paul Ashworth
- Ruth Gemmell as Sarah Hughes
- Mark Strong as Steve
- Neil Pearson as Mr. Ashworth
- Lorraine Ashbourne as Mrs. Ashworth
- Holly Aird as Jo
- Stephen Rea as Ray
- Emily Conway as Sasha
- Richard Claxton as Robert Parker
- Annette Ekblom as Robert's Mother
- Andy Raines as Football Referee
- Mike Ingham as Radio Announcer
- Ken Stott as Ted, the Headmaster

== Production ==
The film also stars Neil Pearson as Paul's father and Mark Strong as Steve, Paul's best friend. Nick Hornby has a cameo as a beaten opposition manager in a school football match. Parts of the film were shot on location in the surroundings of Arsenal Stadium in Highbury; as the terracing at Highbury had since been replaced, the scenes of fans on the terraces were instead filmed at Fulham's Craven Cottage stadium.

== Remake ==
In 2005, the film was remade in an American version also entitled Fever Pitch (2005) starring Jimmy Fallon and Drew Barrymore, with the 2004 World Series Boston Red Sox replacing Arsenal. To avoid confusion, this 2005 remake is known as The Perfect Catch in the UK.

== See also ==
- List of association football films
