= Funny Girl (novel) =

2014 novel by Nick Hornby

- First edition
- Author: Nick Hornby
- Genre: Novel
- Publisher: Penguin/Viking
- Publication date: 6 November 2014
- Media type: Print
- Pages: 342 (hardcover edition)
- ISBN: 978-0-670-92280-2

Funny Girl is a 2014 novel by the British writer Nick Hornby. The book was adapted for television as Funny Woman, broadcast by Sky Max in 2023 starring Gemma Arterton.

== Plot ==
In 1964, Barbara Parker wins the Miss Blackpool beauty contest but immediately relinquishes her title after realising that the responsibilities of a beauty queen would keep her in her hometown. Inspired by her idol Lucille Ball, Barbara dreams of becoming a television comedian rather than pursuing a career based on her appearance. She leaves her father in Blackpool and moves to London, hoping to establish herself in the entertainment industry.

After arriving in London, Barbara finds employment at the cosmetics counter of the Derry & Toms department store. She shares accommodation with Marjorie, a fellow shop assistant, but initially struggles to find opportunities in show business. Marjorie encourages her to pursue relationships with wealthy men, leading Barbara to an unsuccessful date with a married man named Valentine Laws. Following the encounter, she meets theatrical agent Brian Debenham, who offers to represent her. Although Brian initially believes that Barbara's appearance makes her better suited to modelling, she insists on pursuing comedy. At his suggestion, she adopts the professional name, Sophie Straw.

After several unsuccessful auditions, Sophie is considered for a BBC television comedy pilot about a young married couple. The programme has been developed by writers Tony Holmes and Bill Gardiner, whose previous work in radio comedy has brought them recognition. Dennis Maxwell-Bishop is the producer and director, and actor Clive Richardson has been selected to play the male lead. The original script fails to satisfy its creators, but Sophie's audition demonstrates her comic abilities and prompts Tony and Bill to reconsider the programme's direction. They rewrite the material around her character, a working-class woman from northern England married to a middle-class man.

The resulting sitcom, Barbara (and Jim), becomes a major television success, attracting millions of viewers and turning Sophie into a household name. Although Clive initially expects to dominate the programme, Sophie's popularity establishes her as its lead, creating tension between the two performers. The writers continue developing stories based on the fictional couple's differences, while Sophie becomes increasingly involved in the creative process. The programme's success also brings scrutiny from BBC executives and cultural critics, particularly Vernon Whitfield, who considers popular television comedy intellectually inferior to more serious forms of entertainment.

Away from the studio, the relationships between the programme's creators become increasingly complicated. Sophie begins a romantic relationship with Clive, despite concerns about his fidelity. Meanwhile, Dennis develops feelings for Sophie while struggling in his marriage to Edith, who is having an affair with Whitfield. Tony and Bill's working relationship is also affected by their personal lives. Both have experienced the restrictions imposed on homosexual men in 1960s Britain, but their circumstances diverge when Tony marries a woman named June. Bill, who remains gay, becomes increasingly dissatisfied with his professional and personal situation and begins writing a novel drawing on his experiences.

As Barbara (and Jim) continues through successive series, its popularity is accompanied by disagreements over its future direction. Sophie becomes disillusioned with Clive after he begins an affair with another actress, and their relationship ends. She also confronts unresolved aspects of her childhood when her mother, who abandoned the family years earlier, reappears. Their reunion leads Sophie to reconsider her mother's departure and the limited opportunities available to women of an earlier generation.

With the sitcom approaching its conclusion, Sophie faces uncertainty about her career. Plans develop for a new programme centred on her character, entitled Just Sophie, but the project fails to match the success of Barbara (and Jim). Meanwhile, her friendship with Dennis develops into a romantic relationship after his marriage breaks down. When Sophie discovers that she is pregnant, Brian advises her to consider terminating the pregnancy to protect her career. She rejects his advice and chooses to marry Dennis, leaving behind her established life in London.

The novel subsequently moves forward several decades, revisiting the characters after the height of their television careers has passed. Sophie and the surviving members of the Barbara (and Jim) team reunite for a nostalgic revival of their former programme. Their meeting reveals the different directions their lives have taken since working together. Sophie reflects on her years in television, her marriage to Dennis and the changes in British popular culture, acknowledging that she still misses performing despite the life she has built outside the entertainment industry.

== Reception ==
The Guardian praised the consistency of the lighthearted tone of the novel with the style of British comedy television in the 1960s, which Hornby defends resolutely. Similarly, The New York Times comments positively on the position of the author towards pop culture, defining Hornby as "competent and humane". The Independent criticized the change of focus in the novel, stating "it's a shame that Hornby abandons his funny girl halfway through for more of his hapless men."

Both the Los Angeles Times and the Library Journal report a level of flatness in the writing.

== Adaptation ==
The novel was adapted for screen by writer and comedian Morwenna Banks as the six-part Sky Max series Funny Woman (2023), starring Gemma Arterton as Barbara Parker.
