= Fever Pitch =

Book by Nick Hornby

- First edition
- Author: Nick Hornby
- Language: English
- Genre: Autobiography
- Publisher: Gollancz
- Publication date: 1992
- Publication place: United Kingdom
- Pages: 247
- ISBN: 0-575-05315-1
- OCLC: 27897737

Fever Pitch: A Fan's Life is a 1992 autobiographical essay by English author Nick Hornby. The book is the basis for two films: Fever Pitch (1997, UK) and Fever Pitch (2005, US). The first edition was subtitled "A Fan's Life", but later paperback editions were not.

== Book ==
Fever Pitch, first published in 1992, is a memoir and Hornby's second book. It tells the story of the author's relationship with football, and with Arsenal Football Club in particular. It consists of several chapters in chronological order, from the time the author first became a football fan as a child until his early thirties. Each chapter is about a football match that he remembers watching, most but not all at Arsenal Stadium, Highbury, and how it related to the events that were going on with his life. As well as recounting Arsenal's highs and lows, Hornby talks about other football clubs that play in London, and his interest in the contrasting surroundings of Cambridge United and Cambridge City, whose matches he attends while at university.

Fever Pitch sold over a million copies in the United Kingdom. It won the William Hill Sports Book of the Year in 1992 and was reprinted with a new cover and made available as part of the 2005–06 Arsenal F.C. membership pack as part of the "Final Salute" to Highbury Stadium. The book was made a Penguin Modern Classic in August 2012.

== Adaptations ==
=== 1997 film ===
A 1997 film version of Fever Pitch, with a screenplay adapted by Hornby, fictionalised the story, concentrating on Arsenal's First Division championship-winning season in 1988–89 and its effect on the protagonist's romantic relationship. Paul Ashworth, played by Colin Firth, the character based on Hornby, a teacher at a school in North London and his burgeoning romance with Sarah Hughes (Ruth Gemmell), a new teacher who joins Ashworth's school. The film culminates with Arsenal playing title rivals Liverpool in the final game of the season on 26 May 1989, in which a last minute Michael Thomas goal gives Arsenal the 2–0 win they need to win the title. Fever Pitch compares Hornby's life at Arsenal and other football clubs.

=== 2005 film ===
A 2005 film remake of Fever Pitch, directed by the Farrelly Brothers with Hornby as an executive producer, starred Jimmy Fallon and Drew Barrymore. In this adaptation (based on the 1997 film, not the 1992 book), the action is moved from London to Boston, the focus of the protagonist's obsession is shifted from football to baseball and the story is based on the 2004 Boston Red Sox season, which culminated with the team's first Major League Baseball World Series victory in 86 years. This championship was entirely coincidental; the 2005 version was being filmed during the 2004 regular season, including scenes filmed at Fenway Park during actual games. As the Red Sox continued to progress through the playoffs, the Farrellys rewrote the script to include the historic moment. The movie was renamed The Perfect Catch outside North America to avoid confusion with the 1997 film.
