= About a Boy (film) =

2002 romantic comedy-drama film

- Theatrical release poster
- Directed by: Paul Weitz; Chris Weitz
- Screenplay by: Peter Hedges; Chris Weitz; Paul Weitz
- Based on: About a Boy by Nick Hornby
- Produced by: Jane Rosenthal; Robert De Niro; Brad Epstein; Tim Bevan; Eric Fellner
- Starring: Hugh Grant; Toni Collette; Rachel Weisz; Nicholas Hoult
- Cinematography: Remi Adefarasin
- Edited by: Nick Moore
- Music by: Badly Drawn Boy
- Production companies: StudioCanal; TriBeCa Productions; Working Title Films; KALIMA Productions GmbH & Co. KG
- Distributed by: Universal Pictures (international); Mars Distribution (France)
- Release dates: 26 April 2002 (United Kingdom); 17 May 2002 (United States); 22 August 2002 (Germany); 12 November 2002 (France)
- Running time: 101 minutes
- Countries: United Kingdom; France; Germany; United States
- Language: English
- Budget: $30 million
- Box office: $130.5 million

About a Boy is a 2002 comedy-drama film directed by Paul Weitz and Chris Weitz, who co-wrote the screenplay with Peter Hedges. It is an adaptation of the 1998 novel by Nick Hornby. The film stars Hugh Grant, Nicholas Hoult, Toni Collette, and Rachel Weisz.

The film was theatrically released on 26 April 2002 by Universal Pictures. It was nominated for an Academy Award for Best Adapted Screenplay. Grant and Collette were nominated for a Golden Globe and a BAFTA Award, respectively, for their performances. The film received positive reviews from critics and earned $130.5 million against a $30 million budget.

== Plot ==
Will Freeman lives a carefree lifestyle in London without any responsibility or commitments, thanks to royalties left to him by his father's successful Christmas song. He rejects the common phrase, "No man is an island," insisting that he lives happily as an island, despite disapproval from his married friends.

After a fulfilling and guilt-free fling with a single mother, Will joins the Single Parents Alone Together (SPAT) community group under the pretence that he is the father to an imaginary child, aiming to have the same experience again. He meets Suzie, whom he is attracted to, and Marcus, the socially awkward son of one of Suzie's friends, Fiona, unexpectedly on a planned playdate. When Will and Suzie take Marcus home, they find Fiona (who suffers bouts of depression) has attempted suicide and rush her to the hospital.

Marcus is very close to his mother but has no friends at school and is frequently bullied due to his awkward nature and appearance. Concerned that he may be left on his own if his mother succeeds at killing herself in the future, he becomes determined to find her a boyfriend and creates an awkward lunch date with Will, who is uninterested in Fiona.

Marcus spends a few days following Will and discovers Will's supposed toddler son does not exist. He uses the information to blackmail Will into dating Fiona, but Will refuses. Despite this, Marcus continues turning up at Will's home to watch television after school. They slowly form a bond, strengthened by Will buying Marcus cool new shoes to help him fit in better at school. However, the bullies steal the shoes, and Marcus is forced to confess to his mother that Will bought them, revealing they have formed a friendship and that Will is not a father.

Fiona confronts Will and demands an explanation. He retorts that he is only building confidence in Marcus because he is routinely humiliated and bullied at school. Though Will promises to cease further contact with Marcus, Fiona recognises that Will's genuine interest in her son is good for both of them.

Will joins Marcus and Fiona for Christmas, giving Marcus a Mystikal album and a portable CD player. Despite a tense exchange with Suzie, who has been made aware of Will's deception, he is asked to stay for Christmas dinner and genuinely enjoys his day with Marcus' family.

As Marcus develops a crush on a girl at school named Ellie, Will also meets Rachel, who seems interested in him initially but is turned off by his lack of profession or direction in life. When she begins discussing her son, Ali, Will mentions Marcus, and he allows her to assume Marcus is his son. For the first time, Will has developed a serious interest in a woman and asks Marcus to pose as his son.

Will grows closer to Rachel and eventually makes the awkward confession that Marcus is not his son, suggesting that Rachel is to blame for making the assumption. She then ends the relationship.

Fiona's depression returns, and Marcus goes to Will for help. Will, however, is still upset over his breakup and lashes out at him. He soon finds his previous life of self-dependence unfulfilling, missing Marcus's company. Will decides to reconcile with Marcus and talks to Fiona about her depression, but then finds out from her that he is due to perform at a school talent show that night, which would ultimately result in him being humiliated for the rest of his school life. As expected, Marcus' performance is greeted with brutal mockery, but Will joins in with a guitar, ultimately saving him from total humiliation.

By the next Christmas, Will and Rachel are together, and he has permanently abandoned his previous lifestyle. Will invites one of Tom, his Amnesty International colleagues to set him up with Fiona, and Marcus, Ali and Ellie remain good friends.

== Cast ==
- Hugh Grant as Will Freeman
- Nicholas Hoult as Marcus Brewer
- Toni Collette as Fiona Brewer
- Rachel Weisz as Rachel
- Natalia Tena as Ellie
- Sharon Small as Christine
- Nicholas Hutchinson as John
- Victoria Smurfit as Suzie
- Isabel Brook as Angie
- Jenny Galloway as Frances, member of the SPAT
- Augustus Prew as Ali
- Denise Stephenson as Lindsey
- Rosalind Knight as Lindsey's mum
- Jason Salkey as Tom, the Amnesty International worker
- Tim Rice as himself

== Production ==
=== Development and casting ===
An earlier version of the adaptation had been developed with director Iain Softley. Hugh Grant later recalled that Softley had not favoured him for the role of Will and that the project at that stage used a substantially different screenplay. The rights subsequently passed to Robert De Niro's Tribeca Productions, after which Paul Weitz and Chris Weitz joined the project as directors and co-writers.

Grant took an active interest in the casting of Marcus because he had not previously worked opposite a child in a leading role. He participated in the casting process that resulted in Nicholas Hoult receiving the part.

=== Filming ===
Location filming took place in London, including Regent's Park and London Zoo. After seven weeks of location shooting, production moved to Shepperton Studios, where sets were constructed for the interiors of Will's flat and Fiona's house.

== Soundtrack ==
Singer-songwriter Badly Drawn Boy (Damon Gough) composed and performed the film's original music. Author Nick Hornby later recalled that, after repeatedly listening to Gough's album The Hour of Bewilderbeast, he had independently concluded that Gough would be an ideal choice for the soundtrack. At Hornby's first meeting with the Weitz brothers, they told him that they were already considering Gough for the film.

Gough said that he initially found the screenplay difficult to use as inspiration and instead read Hornby's novel to understand the characters and story. He then met the directors in Los Angeles, viewed a rough cut and worked with them to identify scenes requiring music. Gough estimated that the early cut contained around 80 potential musical cues, and he frequently supplied several alternative pieces for individual scenes.

The soundtrack composed by singer-songwriter Badly Drawn Boy was released on 23 April 2002. The film also included music from Who Wants to Be a Millionaire? by Keith Strachan and Matthew Strachan.

== Release ==
The film had previews in the United Kingdom on 21 April and 25 April 2002 and officially opened on 26 April. It opened the first Tribeca Festival in New York City on 8 May 2002. It was released in the United States and Canada on 17 May 2002.

== Reception ==
=== Box office ===
In the United Kingdom, the film opened at number one with £3.7 million ($5.4 million), including previews, accounting for approximately one-third of the national box-office market. It was Universal's highest-grossing UK opening of 2002 to that point and the third-largest opening weekend of the year, behind Monsters, Inc. and Ocean's Eleven.

The film grossed $8.6 million in its opening weekend in the United States and Canada, finishing fourth at the box office.

With a budget of US$30 million, the film grossed $130.5 million.

=== Critical response ===
About a Boy received critical acclaim. On Rotten Tomatoes, the film holds an approval rating of 93% based on 185 reviews, and an average rating of 7.7/10. The website's critical consensus states, "About a Boy benefits tremendously from Hugh Grant's layered performance, as well as a funny, moving story that tugs at the heartstrings without tilting into treacle." Metacritic assigned the film a weighted average score of 75 out of 100, based on 38 critics, indicating "generally favorable" reviews. Audiences polled by CinemaScore gave the film an average grade of "B+" on an A+ to F scale.

In December 2002, the film was chosen by the American Film Institute as one of the ten best movies of the year. The Washington Post declared the film to be "that rare comedy-drama that dares to choose messiness over closure, prickly independence over fetishised coupledom, and honesty over typical Hollywood endings." Rolling Stone wrote, "The acid comedy of Grant's performance carries the film [and he] gives this pleasing heartbreaker the touch of gravity it needs".

Roger Ebert observed that "the Cary Grant department is understaffed, and Hugh Grant shows here that he is more than a star, he is a resource." The film earned Grant his third Golden Globe nomination, while the London Film Critics Circle named Grant its Best British Actor and GQ honoured him as one of the magazine's men of the year 2002. "His performance can only be described as revelatory," wrote critic Ann Hornaday, adding that "Grant lends the shoals layer upon layer of desire, terror, ambivalence and self-awareness."

The New York Observer concluded: "[The film] gets most of its laughs from the evolved expertise of Hugh Grant in playing characters that audiences enjoy seeing taken down a peg or two as a punishment for philandering and womanising and simply being too handsome for words—and with an English accent besides. In the end, the film comes over as a messy delight, thanks to the skill, generosity and good-sport, punching-bag panache of Mr. Grant's performance."

About a Boy also marked a notable change in Grant's boyish look. Now 41, he had lost weight and also abandoned his trademark floppy hair. Entertainment Weekly's Owen Gleiberman took note of Grant's maturation in his review, saying he looked noticeably older and that it "looked good on him." He added that Grant's "pillowy cheeks are flatter and a bit drawn, and the eyes that used to peer with 'love me' cuteness now betray a shark's casual cunning. Everything about him is leaner and spikier (including his hair, which has been shorn and moussed into a Eurochic bed-head mess), but it's not just his surface that's more virile; the nervousness is gone, too. Hugh Grant has grown up, holding on to his lightness and witty cynicism but losing the stuttering sherry-club mannerisms that were once his signature. In doing so, he has blossomed into the rare actor who can play a silver-tongued sleaze with a hidden inner decency."

=== Awards ===
Award	Category	Recipient	Result	Ref.
Academy Awards	Best Adapted Screenplay	Chris Weitz, Paul Weitz and Peter Hedges	Nominated	
British Academy Film Awards	Best Adapted Screenplay	Chris Weitz, Paul Weitz and Peter Hedges	Nominated	
British Academy Film Awards	Best Actress in a Supporting Role	Toni Collette	Nominated	
Golden Globe Awards	Best Motion Picture – Musical or Comedy		Nominated	
Golden Globe Awards	Best Actor – Musical or Comedy	Hugh Grant	Nominated	

== See also ==
- About a Boy (TV series)
