= Finola Dwyer =

Film producer

Finola Dwyer ONZM
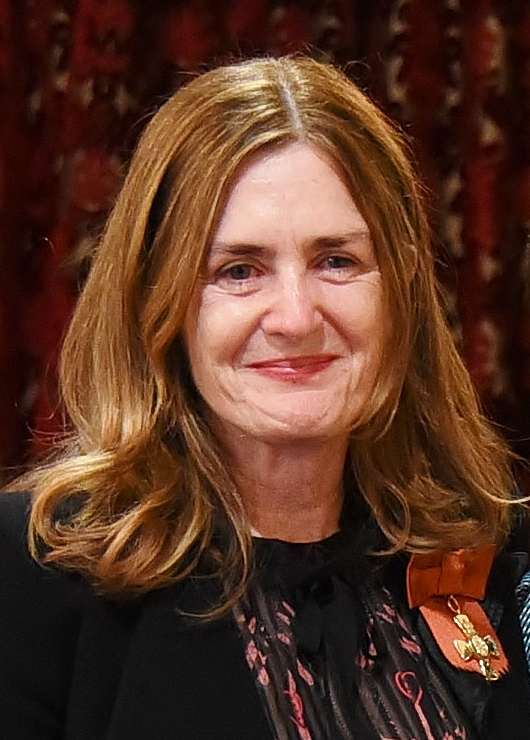
- Dwyer in 2017
- Born: 10 July 1963 (age 62)
- Occupations: Film producer, film editor
- Years active: 1984–present

Finola Dwyer ONZM (born 10 July 1963) is a UK-based New Zealand film producer and editor, best known for her films An Education and Brooklyn, produced with frequent collaborator Amanda Posey.

== Career ==
In 2015, Dwyer produced an historical drama film Brooklyn, starring Saoirse Ronan, directed by John Crowley based on the screenplay by Nick Hornby. She received an Academy Award nomination for the film for Best Picture at the 88th Academy Awards along with Amanda Posey.

In the 2016 Queen's Birthday Honours, Dwyer was appointed an Officer of the New Zealand Order of Merit for services to the film industry.

== Filmography ==
- 1984: Trial Run (editor)
- 1986: Bridge to Nowhere (editor)
- 1986: Queen City Rocker (associate producer)
- 1987: Raglan by the Sea (TV movie documentary, producer)
- 1987: Starlight Hotel (producer)
- 1988: A Soldier's Tale (line producer)
- 1994: Backbeat (producer)
- 1996: Hollow Reed (co-executive producer)
- 1997: Welcome to Woop Woop (producer)
- 1999: The Lost Son (producer)
- 2001: Me Without You (producer)
- 2003: One Love (executive producer)
- 2004: The Open Doors (short, executive producer)
- 2004: The Hamburg Cell (TV movie, producer)
- 2005: Stoned (producer)
- 2006: Opal Dream (executive producer)
- 2006: Alien Autopsy (producer)
- 2006: Severance (producer)
- 2006: Tsunami: The Aftermath (TV movie, producer)
- 2008: My Talks with Dean Spanley (executive producer)
- 2009: An Education (producer)
- 2012: Quartet (producer)
- 2012: Undefeated (short, executive producer)
- 2014: A Long Way Down (producer)
- 2015: Brooklyn (producer)
- 2015: What Our Fathers Did: A Nazi Legacy (documentary, producer)
- 2017: Our Souls at Night (producer)
- 2023: My Mother's Wedding (producer)
- TBA: Hello & Paris (producer)
