= Amanda Posey =

British film producer (born 1965)

- Born: Amanda Rachel Posey; June 1965 (age 60)
- Occupation: Film producer
- Years active: 1997–present
- Known for: Brooklyn
- Spouse: Nick Hornby
- Children: 2

Amanda Rachel Posey (born June 1965) is a British film producer, best known for her films An Education (2009) and Brooklyn (2015), produced with frequent collaborator Finola Dwyer. She is married to novelist and screenwriter Nick Hornby, with whom she has two sons.

== Career ==
In 2015, Posey produced an historical drama film Brooklyn, starring Saoirse Ronan, directed by John Crowley based on the screenplay by Nick Hornby. She received an Academy Award nomination for the film for Best Picture at the 88th Academy Awards along with Finola Dwyer.

== Selected filmography ==
- 1997: Fever Pitch (producer)
- 2004: The Open Doors (Short, executive producer)
- 2005: Fever Pitch (producer)
- 2009: An Education (producer)
- 2012: Quartet (associate producer)
- 2014: A Long Way Down (producer)
- 2015: Brooklyn (producer)
- 2016: Their Finest (producer)
