= ME+EM =

British clothing brand

- Type: Privately held company
- Industry: Fashion
- Founded: 2009; 17 years ago
- Founder: Clare Hornby
- Headquarters: London, UK
- Number of employees: 380
- Website: www.meandem.com

ME+EM is a British fashion brand that produces luxury clothing and accessories for women. It operates under a direct-to-consumer business model, retailing through its website and stores across the UK and the United States.

== History ==
ME+EM was founded by Clare Hornby and Emma Howarth in 2007. The brand was initially called Pyjama Room and specialised in luxury loungewear for women.

In 2009 the brand was renamed ME+EM and expanded its offering to include ready-to-wear. Emma Howarth left the business in 2012, while Clare Hornby remained as the brand's CEO. In January 2018, the label opened its first retail store on New Cavendish Street in London, and its first concession in Selfridges in September.

In February 2024, ME+EM opened its first international store on Madison Avenue in New York City, before opening three more locations in the US: SoHo, NYC, East Hampton, NY, and Dallas, TX. 2024 also saw the brand launch its debut swimwear collection, followed by expansion into other product categories, such as footwear and accessories.

In April 2026, ME+EM was awarded a Royal Warrant by Queen Camilla.

In June 2026, the brand’s founder and CEO Clare Hornby was awarded an OBE for services to the fashion industry. She was named in The King's Birthday Honours List, which was published on 12 June.

In October 2026, Highland Europe announced it had increased its holding, ‘underscoring its confidence in the brand and its growth trajectory.’, following the brand’s increased revenue up to January 2026. During October 2026 ME+EM was awarded Company of the Year, Private, by WWD (Women’s Wear Daily), which was announced on the WW Honors 2026 list.

== Current Operations ==
The company's head office is based in London, where it also has several store locations, including Chelsea, Belgravia, and a Marylebone flagship. Outside of London, ME+EM also has stores in Edinburgh, Scotland, Harrogate, North Yorkshire, Manchester, England and Bath, Somerset. As of 2026, ME+EM has 8 permanent stores in the USA, including Los Angeles, Dallas, Connecticut and Atlanta.
