= Tara Isabella Burton =

American author

Tara Isabella Burton is an American novelist, non-fiction author, journalist, and scholar. She holds a Ph.D. in theology from the University of Oxford (2017) and is a lecturer and research fellow at Catholic University of America. She has been a writer for the Religion News Service, religion writer for Vox, and has published extensively in newspapers, periodicals, and blogs.

== Books ==
- Here in Avalon (Simon & Schuster, 2024)
- Self-Made: Curating Our Image from Da Vinci to the Kardashians (PublicAffairs, 2023)
- The World Cannot Give (Simon & Schuster, 2022)
- Strange Rites: New Religions for a Godless World (PublicAffairs,2020)
- Social Creature (Doubleday, 2018)
