= Jesse Peretz =

American film and television director, producer and musician

- Born: May 19, 1968 (age 58); Cambridge, Massachusetts, U.S.
- Education: Harvard University
- Occupations: Film director, musician
- Years active: 1986–present
- Father: Marty Peretz

Jesse Peretz (born May 19, 1968) is an American film and television director, TV producer and former musician. He first rose to prominence as a bass guitarist and founding member of The Lemonheads, a Cambridge, Massachusetts-based band that formed in 1986. Peretz left the band as a musician shortly before its breakout album, It's a Shame About Ray, was released, but stayed on as the band photographer. After leaving The Lemonheads, he began to work extensively as a director, first in short-form works such as television commercials and music videos, later transitioning to feature films and television series. His directorial work includes the films Our Idiot Brother and Juliet, Naked, and the TV series Girls.

== Career ==
Peretz is a founding member of the Cambridge, Massachusetts-based rock band The Lemonheads, which he formed in high school with classmates Evan Dando and Ben Deily. He left the band as a musician prior to the band's breakthrough album, It's a Shame About Ray; however, he continued to work with them as a photographer and music video director. His first videos for The Lemonheads were for the songs "Mrs. Robinson", "Confetti" and "It's a Shame about Ray". He went on to direct videos for the Foo Fighters (he won a Grammy for Best Music Video for "Learn to Fly"), Jack Black, Nada Surf and The Breeders, as well as creating and co-directing the "Jimmy the Cab-Driver" comedy vignettes for MTV with his friends from Harvard Donal Logue and Clay Tarver. Peretz also directed several commercials including spots for Nike, IKEA, Barq's Root Beer, and the Sony PlayStation. In 1998, he directed a feature film called First Love, Last Rites based on the Ian McEwan short story of the same name. In 2001 he directed The Chateau (starring Paul Rudd), in 2006 The Ex, and in 2011 Our Idiot Brother. He has worked as a producer/director on the HBO show Girls and Showtime's Nurse Jackie. It was announced in 2014 that Peretz would direct an adaptation of the Nick Hornby novel Juliet, Naked, produced by Judd Apatow. Peretz's film version premiered at the 2018 Sundance Film Festival.

== Personal life ==
Peretz was born in Cambridge, Massachusetts, the son of Anne Devereux (née Labouisse), and publisher Marty Peretz. His father is a descendant of Yiddish-language Jewish author I. L. Peretz. His maternal grandparents were Elizabeth Scriven (Clark) and diplomat Henry Richardson Labouisse, Jr. His maternal great-grandfather was art collector and philanthropist Stephen Carlton Clark, who was the son of Alfred Corning Clark and the grandson of inventor Edward C. Clark. His father is Jewish, and his mother is Protestant.

== Filmography ==
=== Film (as director) ===
- First Love, Last Rites (1997)
- The Château (2001)
- The Ex (2006)
- Our Idiot Brother (2011)
- Juliet, Naked (2018)

=== TV (as director) ===
- Girls (18 episodes)
- Nurse Jackie (10 episodes)
- Married (2 episodes)
- The Electric Company (1 episode)
- New Girl (5 episodes)
- The Mindy Project (1 episode)
- The Office U.S. (1 episode)
- Bent (1 episode)
- Important Things with Demetri Martin (5 episodes)
- Orange Is the New Black (2 episodes)
- Happyish (1 episode)
- Divorce (5 episodes)
- GLOW (3 episodes)
- Shrill (1 episode)
- Soundtrack (1 episode)
- High Fidelity (1 episode)
- Teenage Bounty Hunters (1 episode)
- The Shrink Next Door (3 episodes)
- The Summer I Turned Pretty (5 episodes)

== Videography ==
- "Submerge" by Come (1992)
- "It's a Shame About Ray" by The Lemonheads (1992)
- "Confetti" by The Lemonheads (1992)
- "Mrs. Robinson" by The Lemonheads (1992)
- "Shocker in Gloomtown" by The Breeders (1994)
- "So Into You" by Shudder To Think (1994)
- "Cannon" by Self (1995)
- "So Low" by Self (1996)
- "Girl from Mars" by Ash (1996)
- "Popular (Nada Surf song)" by Nada Surf (1996)
- "Big Me" by Foo Fighters (1996)
- "Learn to Fly" by Foo Fighters (1999)
- "I Can Buy You" by A Camp (2001)
- "The One" by Foo Fighters (2002)
- "Idiot Boyfriend" by Jimmy Fallon (2002)
- "The Seed 2.0" by The Roots featuring Cody ChesnuTT (2003)
- "Followed the Waves" by Melissa Auf der Maur (2004)
- "School of Rock" by Jack Black (2004)
- "Low" by Foo Fighters (2003)
- "Long Road to Ruin" by Foo Fighters (2007)
- "Bad Liar" by Selena Gomez (2017)
