= TreeHouse School =

Location
- Woodside Avenue; London, N10 3JA; England; 51.5875°N 0.1509°W

Information
- Type: Special School
- Established: 1997
- Department for Education URN: 135534 Tables
- Ofsted: Reports
- Headteacher: Joanna Dziopa
- Gender: Coeducational
- Age: 4 to 19
- Enrolment: 85+
- Website: https://treehouseschool.org.uk/

TreeHouse School is a non-maintained special school and sixth form for autistic children and young people aged 4 to 19. The school is located in the London Borough of Haringey, England, and is operated by the charity Ambitious about Autism. Children from 17 local authority areas attend the school.

Founded in 1997, by a group of parents including writer Nick Hornby, it was originally based in a room at Swiss Cottage Library. It is currently located in Muswell Hill, where over 100 pupils attend. The school enrols pupils who have a diagnosis of autism and an Education, Health and Care plan.

The school has links with many local businesses, schools and community projects. Some older pupils take part in work experience placements in the area.

The school also runs the Saplings project - an outdoor space providing autistic children and young people an opportunity to learn more about the natural world and develop new skills.

There are over 160 members of staff at the TreeHouse School including qualified teachers, behaviour professionals, speech and language therapists, and occupational therapists.

The school was rated as 'Outstanding' by Ofsted in 2024.
