= Juliet, Naked =

Novel by Nick Hornby

- First edition (UK)
- Author: Nick Hornby
- Genre: Novel
- Published: 29 September 2009
- Publisher: Viking Press (UK); Riverhead Books (US)
- Media type: Print
- Pages: 416 (hardcover edition)
- ISBN: 978-1-59448-887-0
- OCLC: 311778272
- Dewey Decimal: 823/.914 22
- LC Class: PR6058.O689 J85 2009

Juliet, Naked is a novel by the British author Nick Hornby published in 2009. It tells the story of Annie, the long-suffering girlfriend of obsessed music fan Duncan, and the object of his obsession, singer-songwriter Tucker Crowe.

The plot revolves around the release of Juliet, Naked, the first new Tucker Crowe album in over two decades. The novel has been compared with Hornby's first novel, High Fidelity. Hornby has identified parenting, love, and relationships as the book's themes.

== Plot ==
Duncan, an obsessive music fan, receives a CD of Juliet, Naked, an album of solo acoustic demos of the songs on the album Juliet by his favourite artist, Tucker Crowe. Duncan's girlfriend, Annie, opens it first and listens to it on her own. Duncan is angry, especially when she expresses her dislike for it. He writes an enthusiastic review for the fan website he runs. Annie writes a passionate article criticising it and receives an email response from Tucker Crowe himself. Further email correspondence ensues, much of which consumes Annie's thoughts.

Tucker Crowe is in Pennsylvania preparing for a visit from his daughter Lizzie, whom he has never met. He has five children from four relationships; his youngest son Jackson and Jackson's mother, Cat, are the only ones he lives with. Lizzie reveals that she is visiting because she is pregnant.

Duncan meets a new colleague called Gina, whom he sleeps with. He tells Annie of his affair and she insists he move out. The next day Annie talks to her judgmental therapist Malcolm. Duncan regrets leaving Annie but she refuses to take him back. Cat breaks up with Tucker, but Tucker remains to look after Jackson. Annie places a photo of Tucker and Jackson on her fridge and invites Duncan round to make him see it, gleeful that he doesn't know the significance of it, and tells him she is in a relationship with him.

She ponders the years she has wasted with Duncan and ends up going to the pub with her friend Ros; she meets Gav and Barnesy, two Northern Soul dancers. Barnesy comes back to her house and tells her he loves her, but leaves after she says she won't sleep with him. Annie discusses the incident the next day with Malcolm. Tucker learns that Lizzie has lost the baby, and he and Jackson fly to London to see Lizzie. On arrival at the hospital in London, Tucker has a heart attack and is admitted. Lizzie invites all his children and their mothers to visit for a family reunion.

A mini-narrative describes the events which caused Tucker to end his career after hearing that he had a daughter, Grace, from the relationship before/during Juliet. Annie visits him in the hospital, and he suggests staying at her house to avoid the family reunion. The next day Annie visits again, and Annie discovers he had not yet met with Grace. Tucker tells her about Grace and Juliet, and Annie insists he call his family.

They discuss his work; Tucker sees it as inauthentic rubbish, while Annie thinks it is deep and meaningful music while clarifying that while the music is good, it doesn't mean that Tucker as a person is good. She also admits that she was in a relationship with Duncan, whom Tucker knows of from the website. Annie encourages Tucker to meet Duncan, but he refuses. The next day, they bump into Duncan. Tucker introduces himself, but Duncan doesn't believe him. After considering it, Duncan comes over, and Tucker shows Duncan his passport as proof. They have tea together, and Tucker clarifies some of Duncan's beliefs about him, while Duncan expresses his love of his music.

Grace calls Tucker. She says she understands how he and she can't be close because it would mean giving up Juliet. An exhibition Annie has been working on opens at the Gooleness museum, where she works as a curator. She suggests that Tucker could open it, but the councillor in charge says he's never heard of him and invites Gav and Barnsey to do it instead. At the party, Annie admits to Tucker that she likes him romantically, and afterwards they have sex. Annie says she has used a contraceptive, but she hadn't. Tucker and Jackson return to America. Annie tells Malcolm about it all and tells him that she would like to sell her house and move right away to America to join Tucker and Jackson. Malcolm's paternalistic comment make her realise that she needs to leave England.

In the epilogue, Duncan and other fans review on the fan website a new release from Tucker, which they think is terrible; one of them writes 'Happiness Is Poison'. Only one new member says she and her husband love the new album, while they find Juliet too gloomy for their liking.

== Critical reception ==
Reviewing the novel for The Observer, Julie Myerson wrote:

Its likably bleak humour lies mostly in Hornby's pitch-perfect examination of male fandom and the almost sinister way in which the advent of the internet has fed and enabled it. He's every bit as good as you'd expect on the crazed dynamic of the messageboard and the way in which the web has enabled fans to stalk and even, somehow, take possession of their idols from the safety of darkened bedrooms. It's no joke when Annie quips that Duncan knows more about Crowe than Crowe himself. And Hornby knows how such an obsession can haunt a relationship: when Annie observes that she has long accepted the Crowe thing as 'part of the package, like a disability', you know all you need to know about life with Duncan. However, so convincing is the Tucker Crowe who inhabits Duncan's mind that when we meet the real person pushing a trolley around a supermarket somewhere in America with his six-year-old son, it feels deflating. That is Hornby's point – idols are only as big as the fantasies we project on to them. Still, as Crowe establishes himself as the third narrator of this tale, the writing loses its engaging fluidity.

In his review for The Daily Telegraph, Roger Perkins wrote:

A burnt-out case in rural Pennsylvania and a frustrated woman with an etiolated sense of self-worth on the east coast of England – what would happen if they met? The tentative relationship, online then offline, between Annie and Tucker offers Hornby a broad canvas to explore why we so often let the early promise of relationships, ambition and, indeed, life evaporate. Hornby writes so well that you can almost smell the birdseed odour of badly dried clothes combined with failure that pervades Annie's house; his triumph, though, is to find infinite amounts of warmth and humour in this seeming world of desolation.

In The Spectator, Simon Baker called it

Hornby's best novel to date. It is written with the author's usual readable flow, with a style that somehow suggests (without being overt and therefore off-putting) an acquaintanceship between author and reader. This can make one underestimate the quality of the prose: the fact that the sentences are straightforwardly deployed can conceal their unfussy elegance and their wit. Most impressive is that Annie is fully realised as a character, notwithstanding that we are told very little about her past. She is occasionally too perfect – completely self-aware and alert to the subtext of any conversation, always conscious of other people's clichés of word and action – and so can seem like a novelist's proxy. The flipside of her intelligence and insight, however, is that we like her and want her to negotiate this defining period in her life successfully – whether that is with her nerdy ex-boyfriend, her ageing ex-rocker, or no one.

Lev Grossman compared it with another 2009 novel – The Song Is You by Arthur Phillips – and called it

an example of what you might call iPod lit,... novels that meditate on the paradoxical mixture of intimacy and estrangement that arises from listening to digitally recorded music, or really from any human interaction mediated by the Internet." He concludes "this is a novel about people who have wasted massive chunks of their lives – Duncan in sterile rock-critic hermeneutics (he's like the worst-case-scenario future of Rob Fleming from High Fidelity); Annie in a dead romance and a dead-end job; and Crowe in sulky, creatively arid seclusion. They're trying to make the best of what's left, but what's left just isn't that great. Juliet, Naked is a bleaker book than Hornby's A Long Way Down, and that was about four people trying to kill themselves.

== Film adaptation ==
The novel was adapted into a film helmed by the Girls director Jesse Peretz, produced by Judd Apatow, with Kate Winslet attached to star. In October 2016, Ethan Hawke, Rose Byrne, and Chris O'Dowd were cast in the film adaptation. The film was released in 2018 to generally favorable reviews.
