= A Long Way Down =

2005 novel by Nick Hornby

- First edition
- Author: Nick Hornby
- Language: English
- Publisher: Penguin Group
- Publication date: 7 June 2005
- Publication place: United Kingdom
- Media type: Print (hardback & paperback) & Audio CD
- Pages: 352 pp
- ISBN: 1-57322-302-6
- OCLC: 56567128

A Long Way Down is a 2005 novel written by British author Nick Hornby. It is a dark comedy, playing off the themes of suicide, angst, depression and promiscuity.

The story is written in the first-person narrative from the points of view of the four main characters, Martin, Maureen, Jess and JJ. These four strangers happen to meet on the roof of a high building called Toppers House in London on New Year's Eve, each with the intent of committing suicide. Their plans for death in solitude are ruined when they meet. The novel recounts their misadventures as they decide to come down from the roof alive – however temporarily that may be.

== Plot ==
- Part One

Disgraced TV presenter Martin Sharp, lonely single mother Maureen (51 years old); unsuccessful musician JJ and rude teenager Jess (18 years old) meet at Toppers House in London on New Year's Eve. They all want to commit suicide by jumping from the roof. Their plans for death in solitude, however, are ruined when they meet. After telling their individual stories to the others, they decide to hold off on jumping and to help each other. Thus a group of four unfortunate and very individual people forms. Jess's condition not to jump is that they help her to find her ex-boyfriend Chas. So they take a taxi and drive to the party they suppose Chas to be at. After finding and talking to Chas they decide to go to Martin's place where they find Penny, who has obviously been crying. She accuses Martin of cheating on her because he had left the party they'd both attended that evening without any explanation.

- Part Two

The next morning Jess's dad learns that the newspapers are publishing a story about Jess and Martin. Jess tells him that she slept with Martin, to avoid him finding out the truth of her attempted suicide. He takes her to task because the whole thing is very awkward for him. He is the Junior Secretary of Education and has a reputation to lose. He goes out to get an early edition of the paper and sees the story about her 'suicide pact' with Martin, so Jess's "whole sex confession bit had been a complete and utter fucking waste of time".

Jess's father asks Martin to clear up the accusations and Martin denies that he slept with Jess. After the conversation, her father asks Martin to protect Jess and gives him money. Afterwards, a reporter calls JJ wanting to know why they decided not to jump, but JJ refuses to discuss it.

Later Jess calls Maureen, and they decide to organise a meeting at Maureen's place. At the meeting, Jess suggests that they try to profit from the suicidal-report in the newspaper. Her idea is to confess to the press that they saw an angel who saved them from jumping. Martin, Maureen and JJ don't like the idea and they try to convince Jess out of talking to the press. The next morning they find out that Jess told a reporter, Linda, that they saw an angel that looked like Matt Damon. Jess also promised Linda an interview with Martin, Maureen and JJ. Although they are upset with Jess's behaviour, they decide to do the interview. Linda uses the interview to attack Martin in the press. Thus Martin is fired from his cable TV "FeetUpTV!” but he receives a second chance by promising to his boss that the other three will be guests in his show. The show is a disaster and Martin loses his job. At another TV show Jess admits that the angel story was not true.

Later, JJ decides that the four of them have to go on holiday for Maureen's benefit. Martin, Jess and JJ help Maureen to find a place for Matty, her son. One week later they're on a plane to Tenerife. On the second day, Jess sees a girl who looks very similar to her lost sister Jen. Jess bothers the girl and they have a fight. Out of frustration Jess gets drunk and the police have to take her back to the hotel. JJ meets a girl that saw his old band and they spend the night together. Martin decides to leave the hotel after a fight with Jess. During his absence from the others, he thinks about his life and decides that he has made no mistakes. He blames other people for how his life has turned out. In the taxi to the airport they talk about their holiday and plan another meeting for Valentine's Day.

They meet at 8 o'clock on the roof of Toppers House on Valentine's Day. While they have a conversation, they see a young man who is planning to jump from the roof. They try to stop him from committing suicide but he jumps. They decide to go home and to meet the following afternoon at Starbucks.

- Part Three

Martin tells them about a newspaper article he read according to which people who want to commit suicide need 90 days to overcome their predicament. So they decide to hold their decision until 31 March.

Maureen and Jess decide to visit Martin's ex-wife Cindy to bring her back to him. Cindy Sharp lives with her kids in Torley Heath and has a new partner Paul, whom Maureen and Jess later find out is blind. Cindy explains to them that Martin made many mistakes and that he didn't take care of the children.

After that, Jess organises a meeting in the basement of Starbucks. She invites relatives of the four. All in all, seventeen people appear, but the meeting is a disaster. Jess and her parents are screaming at each other because her mother claims that she had stolen a pair of earrings from Jen's untouched room. While they are fighting Jess runs out of the Starbucks. JJ and a former member of his band are leaving the basement to have a fight and Martin has an argument with one of Maureen's nurses because he claims that he's flirting with Penny. Maureen is the only one of the four who is still present. She talks to Jess's parents and speculates that Jen may have come back to take the earrings. The nurses Sean and Stephen help Maureen to bring Matty home and on the way Sean asks her if she is interested in joining their quiz team. At the quiz, an old man from the team offers Maureen a job in a newsagent's. When Jess comes back from her trip to London Bridge, her mother apologizes for accusing her. Jess accepts the apology, seeing the hope Maureen's suggestion has given her mother.

Maureen, JJ and Martin have new jobs now. Martin is a teacher, and wants to start a new life; JJ is a busker and is happy to make music again; and Maureen has started work at the newsagent's.

The ninety days have passed and they meet in a pub near Toppers House. They decide to go on the roof again. While watching the London Eye from the roof, they realise that their lives aren't that bad. They decide to delay their final decision on killing themselves for another six months.

== Reviews ==
The book received mixed reviews from critics. The review aggregator Metacritic reported the book had an average score of 55 out of 100, based on 32 reviews.

== Adaptation ==
Johnny Depp bought the rights to the book before it was published and hired writer D.V. DeVincentis, who previously wrote the script for the film High Fidelity, to write the screenplay. Depp is also quoted on the back of the paperback edition as saying that the book is "Masterful ... some of the finest writing, and some of the most outstanding characters I've ever had the pleasure of reading."

However, when the rights came up for renewal Hornby awarded them to his partner Amanda Posey and producer Finola Dwyer. The film stars Pierce Brosnan as Martin Sharp, Imogen Poots as Jess Crichton, Toni Collette as Maureen, Aaron Paul as J.J. and Sam Neill as Jess's father. It was released in early 2014.
