= Nick Hornby =

English writer (born 1957)

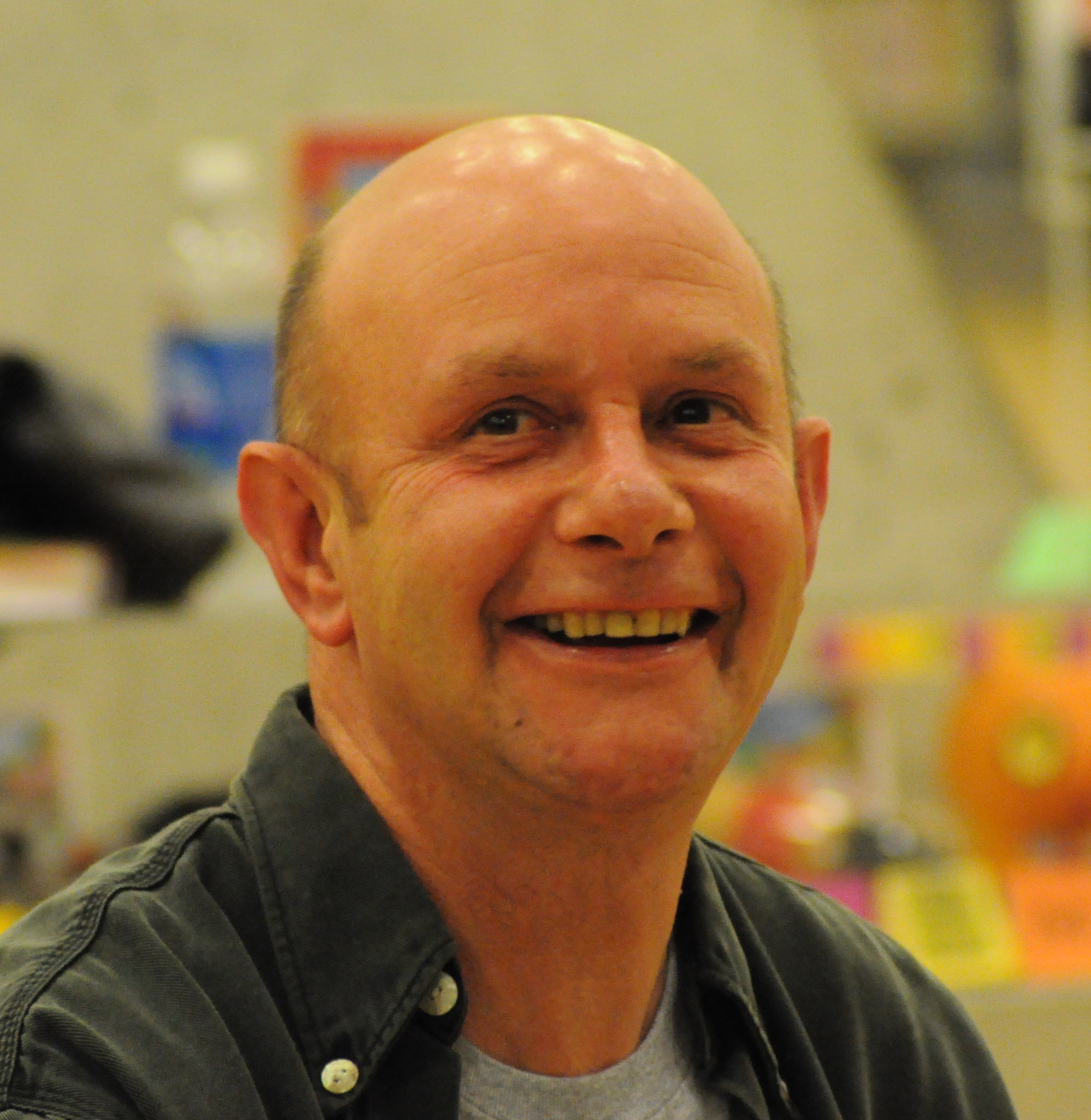
- Hornby in 2009
- Born: Nicholas Peter John Hornby; 17 April 1957 (age 69); Redhill, Surrey, England
- Education: University of Cambridge
- Occupations: Writer, editor, screenwriter
- Spouse: Amanda Posey (sep. 2021)
- Children: 3
- Relatives: Derek Hornby (father); Johnny Hornby (half-brother); Robert Harris (brother-in-law)
- Writing career
- Period: 1992–present
- Genres: Fiction, non-fiction
- Notable works: Fever Pitch (1992); High Fidelity (1995); About a Boy (1998)

Nicholas Peter John Hornby (born 17 April 1957) is an English writer. He is best known for his memoir Fever Pitch (1992) and novels High Fidelity (1995) and About a Boy (1998), all of which were adapted into feature films. Hornby's work frequently touches upon music, sport, and the aimless and obsessive natures of his protagonists. His books have sold more than 5 million copies worldwide as of 2018. In a 2004 poll for the BBC, Hornby was named the 29th most influential person in British culture. He has received two Academy Award for Best Adapted Screenplay nominations for An Education (2009), and Brooklyn (2015).

== Early life and education ==
Hornby was born in Redhill, Surrey, England, the son of Sir Derek Hornby, the chairman of London and Continental Railways, and Margaret Audrey Withers. He was brought up in Maidenhead, and educated at Maidenhead Grammar School and Jesus College, Cambridge, where he read English. His parents divorced when he was eleven.

Before becoming a novelist, Hornby worked for a time as a secondary-school English teacher.

== Career ==
Hornby published his first book in 1992, a collection of essays about American writers such as Tobias Wolff and Ann Beattie, titled Contemporary American Fiction. Hornby's second book, Fever Pitch, also published in 1992, is an autobiographical story detailing his fanatical support for Arsenal Football Club. As a result, Hornby received the William Hill Sports Book of the Year Award. In 1997, the memoir was adapted for film in the UK, and in 2005 an American remake was released, following Jimmy Fallon's character's obsession with the Boston Red Sox, a baseball team. With the book's success, Hornby began to publish articles in the Sunday Times, Time Out and the Times Literary Supplement, in addition to his music reviews for the New Yorker.

High Fidelity — his third book and first novel — was published in 1995. The novel, about a neurotic record collector and his failed relationships, was adapted into a 2000 American film starring John Cusack, a Broadway musical in 2006, and a television show High Fidelity starring Zoë Kravitz in 2020.

His second novel, About a Boy, published in 1998, is about two "boys" — Marcus, an awkward yet endearing adolescent from a single-parent family, and the free-floating, mid-30s Will Freeman, who overcomes his own immaturity and self-centredness through his growing relationship with Marcus. Hugh Grant and Nicholas Hoult starred in the 2002 film version. In 1999, Hornby received the E. M. Forster Award of the American Academy of Arts and Letters.

Hornby's next novel, How to Be Good, was published in 2001. The female protagonist in the novel explores contemporary morals, marriage and parenthood. It was longlisted for the Man Booker Prize in 2001 and won the W.H. Smith Award for Fiction in 2002.

Part of the money he earned with his next book, Speaking with the Angel in 2002, was donated to TreeHouse, a charity for autistic children: Hornby's own son is autistic. He was editor of the book, which contained twelve short stories written by his friends. He also contributed to the collection with the story "NippleJesus".

In 2003, Hornby wrote a collection of essays on selected popular songs and the emotional resonance they carry, called 31 Songs (known in the US as Songbook). Also in 2003, Hornby was awarded the London Award 2003, an award that was selected by fellow writers.

Hornby has also written essays on various aspects of popular culture and, in particular, he has become known for his writing on pop music and mix tape enthusiasts. Since 2003, he has written a book review column, "Stuff I've Been Reading", for the monthly magazine The Believer; all of these articles are collected between The Polysyllabic Spree (2004), Housekeeping vs. The Dirt (2006), Shakespeare Wrote for Money (2008), and More Baths Less Talking (2012).

Hornby's novel A Long Way Down was published in 2005, with a film version of this book released in 2014. It was on the shortlist for the Whitbread Novel Award. Hornby has also edited two sports-related anthologies: My Favourite Year and The Picador Book of Sports Writing.

Hornby's book Slam was published on 16 October 2007; it is his first novel for young adults and was recognised as a 2008 ALA Best Books for Young Adults. The protagonist of Slam is a 16-year-old skateboarder named Sam, whose life changes drastically when his girlfriend gets pregnant.

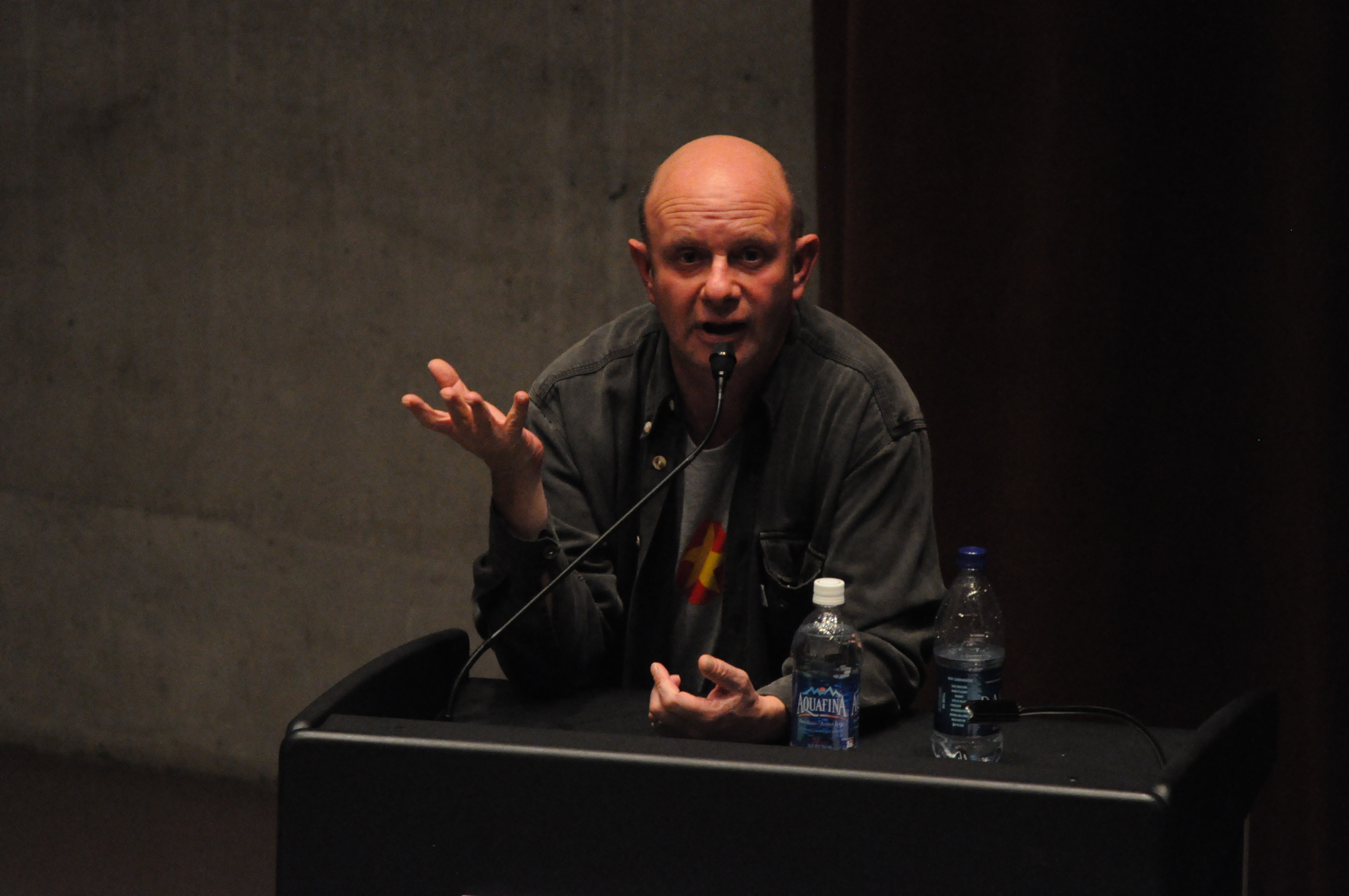
Hornby at a public reading at Central Library in Seattle, 2009

Hornby's following novel, titled Juliet, Naked, was published in September 2009. Addressing similar themes as his earlier novel High Fidelity, the book is about a reclusive 1980s rock star who is forced out of isolation, after the release of demo recordings of the songs on his most famous album brings him into contact with some of his most passionate fans.

In 2010, Hornby co-founded the Ministry of Stories, a non-profit organisation in East London dedicated to helping children and young adults develop writing skills and to helping teachers inspire their students to write.

Hornby discussed his bouts of depression in 2012 on the BBC Radio 4 broadcast of "Fever Pitched: Twenty Years On".

Hornby's most recent novels are Funny Girl (2014), about a 1960s beauty queen determined to make her mark upon television comedy, State of the Union (2019) and Just Like You (2020).

=== Screenwriting ===
Hornby has also developed a career as a screenwriter, and has said that he enjoys the challenge of working in film as opposed to writing novels. In his BAFTA and BFI Screenwriters' Lecture he said: "once you get to a certain point in your novelistic career, unless you screw up very badly the book is going to come out. With a screenplay there are all these hurdles that seem to have some kind of objectivity to them. The screenplay has to work and I love that."

In 2009, Hornby adapted an autobiographical memoir by the journalist Lynn Barber for the screen as An Education, a feature film starring Peter Sarsgaard and Carey Mulligan. He was nominated for the Academy Award for Best Adapted Screenplay and for two BAFTAs.

In 2014, Hornby adapted another autobiographical memoir, Cheryl Strayed's Wild: From Lost to Found on the Pacific Crest Trail. Wild, which starred Reese Witherspoon and Laura Dern, was nominated for Best Actress for Witherspoon and Best Supporting Actress for Dern. Speaking on the challenge of adapting such a packed book, Hornby said it was really a case of boiling everything down and making the realisation that he could have made a two-hour film without mentioning walking at all.

In 2015, he wrote the script for the film Brooklyn, an adaptation of Colm Tóibín's novel of the same name. Tim Robey of The Daily Telegraph said it was "his strongest work ever as a screenwriter". According to Metacritic, the film is on eighty "top 10" lists for 2015. He was nominated for his second Oscar for writing the screenplay and received two BAFTA nominations, winning one.

In 2016, Hornby adapted Nina Stibbe's book Love, Nina: Despatches from Family Life into a television series. Love, Nina received its debut on BBC One on 20 May 2016, and ran for five episodes.

== Adaptations ==
=== Film ===
Several of Hornby's books have made the jump from page to screen. Hornby wrote the screenplay for the first, a 1997 British adaptation of Fever Pitch, starring Colin Firth. It was followed by High Fidelity in 2000, starring John Cusack, with the action shifted from London to Chicago. After this success, About a Boy was quickly picked up, and released in 2002, starring Hugh Grant. An Americanized Fever Pitch, in which Jimmy Fallon plays a hopelessly addicted Boston Red Sox fan who tries to reconcile his love of the game with that of his girlfriend (Drew Barrymore), was released in 2005. Johnny Depp purchased film rights to the book A Long Way Down before it was published. The book was made into the 2014 film of the same name starring Pierce Brosnan, Aaron Paul, Toni Collette and Imogen Poots. In 2015, he wrote the screenplay for Brooklyn starring Saoirse Ronan. The film adaptation of Juliet, Naked was released in 2018 starring Rose Byrne, Ethan Hawke and Chris O'Dowd.

=== Stage ===
High Fidelity was also the basis for a 2006 eponymous musical that shifted the action to Brooklyn; its book is by David Lindsay-Abaire with lyrics by Amanda Green, and music created by Tom Kitt. The production ran for a month in Boston, then moved to Broadway, closing after 18 previews and 14 regular performances.

=== Television ===
About a Boy was adapted for television and aired on NBC from 22 February 2014 to 17 February 2015. The show was developed by Jason Katims and it is the second adaptation based on the 1998 novel. The series stars David Walton, Minnie Driver and Benjamin Stockham.

Hulu premiered a 10-episode reboot of High Fidelity starring Zoë Kravitz on 14 February 2020.

== Music ==
The importance of music in Hornby's novels, and in his life, is evidenced by his long-standing and fruitful collaborations with the rock band Marah, fronted by Dave and Serge Bielanko. Hornby has even toured in the United States and Europe with the band, joining them on stage to read his essays about particular moments and performers in his own musical history that have had a particular meaning for him.

Hornby's music criticism (most notably for The New Yorker and in his own Songbook) has been widely criticised by writers such as Kevin Dettmar (in his book Is Rock Dead), Curtis White (in an essay at www.centreforbookculture.org, titled "Kid Adorno"), Barry Faulk and Simon Reynolds for his embrace of rock traditionalism and conservative take on post-rock and other experimental musics (exemplified in Hornby's negative review of the Radiohead album Kid A).

Hornby has also had extensive collaboration with American singer/songwriter Ben Folds. Their album Lonely Avenue was released in September 2010. Folds wrote the music, with Hornby contributing lyrics. Prior to the album's release, the single "Picture Window" was released on Ben Folds' website. A bootleg version of a song about Levi Johnston written by Hornby and Folds and performed by Folds, appeared on the internet. Remaining Hornby lyrics provided the title song of the 2012 Ben Folds Five reunion album, The Sound of the Life of the Mind.

In 2022, Hornby released the book Dickens and Prince, where he makes connections between the musician Prince and author Charles Dickens.

== Personal life ==
Hornby has been married twice. He and his first wife have one son, born in 1993, who is autistic. Hornby's second wife is producer Amanda Posey. They separated in 2021. They have two sons, born in 2001 and 2004. Hornby's sister, writer Gill Hornby, is married to writer Robert Harris.

Nick Hornby was directly involved in the creation of the charity Ambitious about Autism, then known as TreeHouse Trust, and its school TreeHouse School, as a result of trying to find specialist education for his son Danny. Hornby remains a major donor to the charity and is still involved as a vice-president.

In 2010, Nick Hornby co-founded Ministry of Stories, a writing charity based in Hoxton, east London. The charity was inspired by Dave Eggers' 826 Valencia model in San Francisco and aims to offer young people a chance to develop writing and literacy skills and develop a love of writing for pleasure.

Hornby supports Arsenal Football Club.

In March 2026, Hornby was announced by Tomorrow's Warriors – a music education and artist development charity founded in 1991 – as one of the organisation's 12 inaugural patrons, the others being Baroness Amos, Margaret Busby, Guy Chambers, Robert Elms, Lizzie Ridding and John Ridding, Michael Watt, Richard Wyatt, Femi Koleoso, Eska and Moses Boyd.

== Awards and honours ==
- 1993: William Hill Sports Book of the Year, Fever Pitch
- 1996: Elected Fellow of the Royal Society of Literature
- 1999: E. M. Forster Award
- 2002: WH Smith Literary Award, How to be Good
- 2002: National Book Critics Circle Award, shortlist, 31 Songs
- 2003: London Award
- 2005: Whitbread Novel Award, shortlist, A Long Way Down
- 2008: ALA Best Books for Young Adults, Slam
- 2012: British Sports Book Awards, Outstanding Contribution to Sports Writing

== Bibliography ==
=== Novels ===
- (1995) High Fidelity
- (1998) About a Boy
- (2001) How to Be Good
- (2005) A Long Way Down
- (2007) Slam
- (2009) Juliet, Naked
- (2014) Funny Girl
- (2019) State of the Union
- (2020) Just Like You
- (2027) Cash Out

=== Short stories ===
- (1998) Faith
- (2000) NippleJesus (Published in Speaking with the Angel, Edited by Nick Hornby)
- (2003) Otherwise Pandemonium (Published in McSweeney's Mammoth Treasury of Thrilling Tales, Edited by Michael Chabon)
- (2005) Not a Star (Part of Penguin's Open Door Series)
- (2005) Small Country
- (2007) J. Johnson (Published in The Book of Other People, Edited by Zadie Smith)
- (2012) Everyone's Reading Bastard

=== Non-fiction ===
Books

- (1992) Contemporary American Fiction ISBN 0-312-04213-2
- (1992) Fever Pitch ISBN 0-14-029344-2
- (2003) 31 Songs ISBN 0-14-101340-0 (Also published as Songbook in the US, ISBN 1-57322-356-5)
- (2004) The Polysyllabic Spree ISBN 1-932416-24-2
- (2005) The Complete Polysyllabic Spree ISBN 9780670916665 (Features The Polysyllabic Spree and Housekeeping vs. the Dirt)
- (2006) Housekeeping vs. the Dirt ISBN 1-932416-59-5
- (2008) Shakespeare Wrote for Money ISBN 1-934781-29-0
- (2012) More Baths Less Talking ISBN 978-1-938073-05-2
- (2012) Pray: Notes on the 2011/2012 Football Season ISBN 9780241964736
- (2013) Fan Mail: 20 Years of Writing About Soccer ISBN 9780698156883
- (2013) Books, Movies, Rhythm, Blues: Twenty Years of Writing About Film, Music and Books ISBN 9780698156906
- (2013) Stuff I've Been Reading ISBN 9780241003336 (Features Shakespeare Wrote for Money and More Baths Less Talking)
- (2013) Ten Years in the Tub ISBN 978-1-938073-73-1 (Features The Polysyllabic Spree, Housekeeping vs. the Dirt, Shakespeare Wrote for Money and More Baths Less Talking)
- (2022) Dickens and Prince: A Particular Kind of Genius ISBN 9780593541821
- (2024) Rosamond Lehmann in Vegas ISBN 9781952119989

Essays

- (2014) The Artists We Deserve (in Let's Talk About Love: Why Other People Have Such Bad Taste, new and expanded edition by Carl Wilson) ISBN 978-1-1111-0000-1

=== Anthologies edited ===
- (1993) My Favourite Year: A Collection of Football Writing ISBN 0-7538-1441-2
- (1996) The Picador Book of Sportswriting ISBN 0-330-33133-7
- (2000) Speaking with the Angel ISBN 0-14-029678-6
- (2005) Otherwise Pandemonium ISBN 0-14-102251-5
- (2013) Ten Years in the Tub: A Decade Soaking in Great Books ISBN 978-1-938073-73-1

=== Screenplays ===
Film

- (1997) Fever Pitch — directed by David Evans
- (2009) An Education — directed by Lone Scherfig
- (2014) Wild — directed by Jean-Marc Vallée
- (2015) Brooklyn — directed by John Crowley

Television

- (2016) Love, Nina
- (2019–2022) State of the Union

== Adaptations ==
- (1997) Fever Pitch — directed by David Evans; screenplay by Nick Hornby
- (1998) Faith — short based on short story; directed by Pete Travis
- (2000) High Fidelity — directed by Stephen Frears
- (2002) About a Boy — directed by Chris and Paul Weitz
- (2005) Fever Pitch — directed by Bobby and Peter Farrelly
- (2012) È nata una star? — Italian-language adaptation of Not a Star directed by Lucio Pellegrini
- (2014) A Long Way Down — directed by Pascal Chaumeil
- (2014-2015) About a Boy — television series; created by Jason Katims
- (2016) Tutto per una ragazza — Italian adaptation of Slam directed by Andrea Molaioli
- (2018) Juliet, Naked — directed by Jesse Peretz
- (2019-2022) State of the Union — television series; written by Nick Hornby
- (2020) High Fidelity — television series; developed by Veronica West and Sarah Kucserka
- (2022) Derrapada — Brazilian adaptation of Slam directed by Pedro Amorim
- (2023-2024) Funny Woman — television series based on Funny Girl; written by Morwenna Banks

== See also ==
- List of Academy Award winners and nominees from Great Britain

Awards
Preceded by Thomas Hauser	William Hill Sports Book of the Year winner 1992	Succeeded by Stephen Jones
