= High Fidelity (novel) =

1995 novel by Nick Hornby

- First edition
- Author: Nick Hornby
- Language: English
- Publisher: Victor Gollancz Ltd
- Publication date: 16 September 1995
- Publication place: United Kingdom
- Media type: Print (Hardback & Paperback)
- Pages: 253 pp
- ISBN: 0-575-05748-3
- OCLC: 32237794
- Followed by: About a Boy

High Fidelity is a novel by British author Nick Hornby first published in 1995. It has sold over a million copies and was later adapted into a feature film in 2000, a Broadway musical in 2006 and a TV series in 2020. In 2003, the novel was listed on the BBC's survey The Big Read.

== Plot summary ==
Rob Fleming is a 35-year-old man who owns a record shop in London called Championship Vinyl. His lawyer girlfriend, Laura, has just left him and now he's going through a crisis. At his record shop, Rob and his employees, Dick and Barry, spend their free moments discussing mix-tape aesthetics and constructing desert-island "top-five" lists of anything that demonstrates their knowledge of music, movies, and pop culture. Rob uses this exercise to create his own list: "The top five most memorable split-ups." This list includes the following ex-girlfriends: 1) Alison Ashworth, 2) Penny Hardwick, 3) Jackie Allen, 4) Charlie Nicholson, and 5) Sarah Kendrew.

Rob, recalling these breakups, sets about getting in touch with the former girlfriends. Eventually, Rob's re-examination of his failed relationships, a one-night stand with an American musician named Marie LaSalle, and the death of Laura's father bring the two back together. Their relationship is cemented by the launch of a new purposefulness to Rob's life in the revival of his disc jockey career.

Also, realizing that his fear of commitment (a result of his fear of death of those around him) and his tendency to act on emotion are responsible for his continuing desires to pursue new women, Rob makes a token commitment to Laura.

== Characters ==
- Rob Fleming: 35-year-old music lover in London who is going through an existential crisis and trying to figure out where he goes wrong in romantic relationships
- Laura: Rob's ex-girlfriend who works as a lawyer and is having a fling with a former neighbour named Ian
- Barry: Rob's co-worker at Championship Vinyl who longs to be a musician
- Dick: Rob's co-worker at Championship Vinyl who is socially awkward and extremely into music
- Marie LaSalle: An American musician who has a one-night stand with Rob
