= Molly (memoir) =

2023 memoir

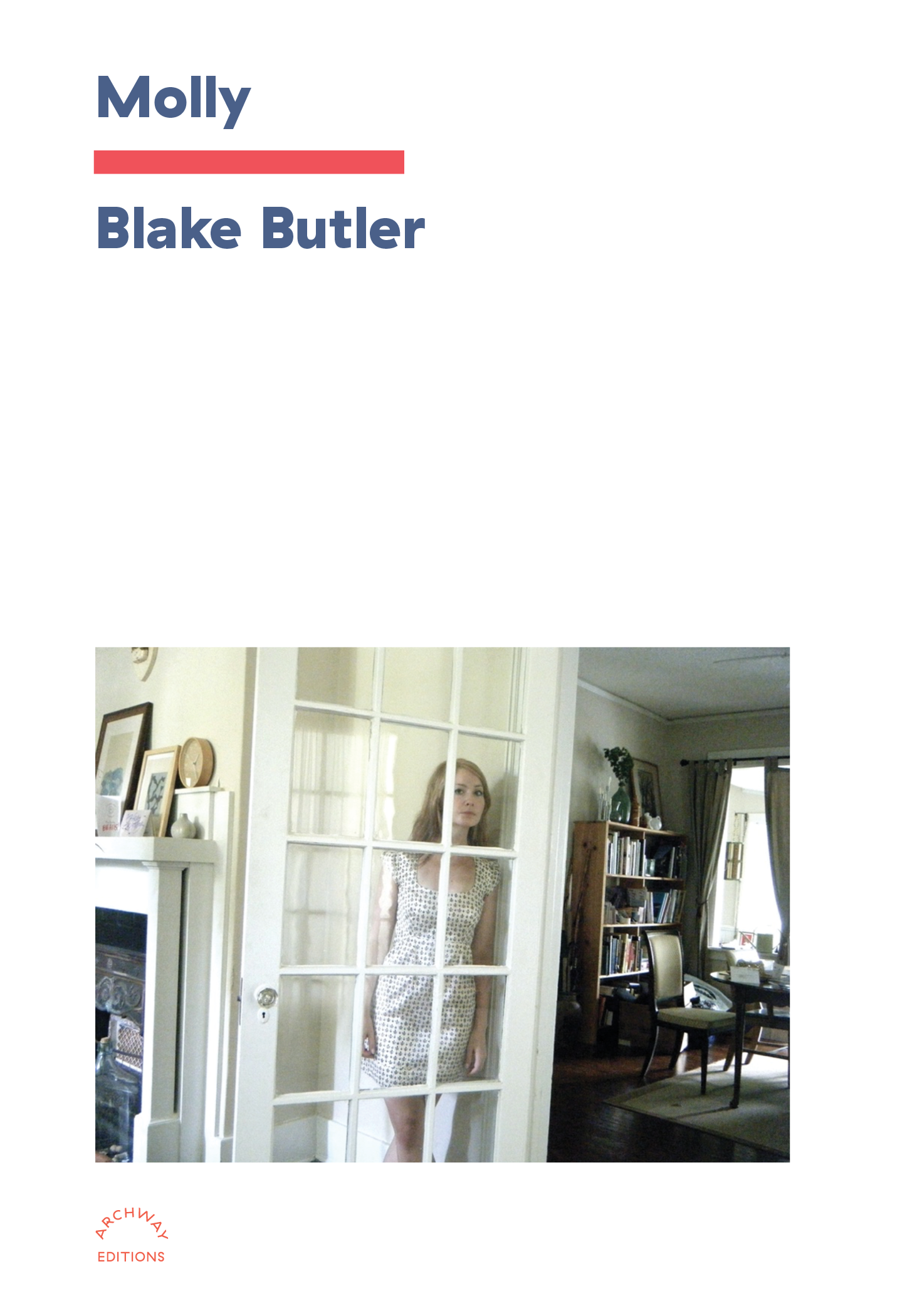
- Author: Blake Butler
- Genre: Memoir
- Publisher: Archway Editions
- Publication date: 2023
- ISBN: 9781648230370

Molly is a 2023 memoir written by Blake Butler and published by Archway Editions. It is a work of autobiography detailing his marriage to and subsequent suicide of the poet Molly Brodak.

== Background and publication ==
Blake Butler is the author of several books, including Alice Knott (Riverhead, 2020), Nothing: A Portrait of Insomnia (Harper Perennial, 2011), and Scorch Atlas (Featherproof Books, 2009). Prior to publication excerpts appeared in The Paris Review and Harper's.

== Reception ==
Jessica Ferri in the Los Angeles Times called it "the best book I've read this year," while in The Atlanta Journal-Constitution, Suzanne Van Atten wrote that it is a "dark, gorgeously crafted read". The Telegraph concluded that "the triumph of his book lies in its compassion. Instead of shaming Brodak, he shows respect to her trickle-down trauma. He diagnoses her – I suspect accurately – with borderline personality disorder. He tells us every awful truth about a toxic relationship. And he does it with real, unending love."

Molly also drew controversy. Author Sarah Rose Etter accused Butler of exploitation, describing Molly as "literary revenge porn against a mentally unwell woman who took her own life."
