= Tina Rivers Ryan =

American curator, editor

- Born: Tina Rivers
- Education: Harvard University (BA), Columbia University (PhD)
- Occupations: Curator, researcher, art historian, author, editor
- Employer(s): Artforum (2024–present); Albright–Knox Art Gallery (2017–2024)
- Known for: New media art scholar, editor
- Website: tinariversryan.com

Tina Rivers Ryan is an American curator, researcher, author, editor, and art historian. Her expertise is in new media art, which includes digital art, and internet art. She was a curator at the Albright–Knox Art Gallery, now Buffalo AKG Art Museum, in Buffalo, New York, from 2017 to 2024. From 2024 until February 2026, Ryan was named the editor-in-chief of Artforum magazine.

== Early life and education ==
Tina Rivers Ryan attended Gulliver Preparatory School in Miami for high school. She has a BA degree from Harvard University, and a PhD from Columbia University. Her dissertation was, McLuhan’s Bulbs: Light Art and the Dawn of New Media (2016), her doctoral advisor was Branden W. Joseph. She worked as a fellow at the Metropolitan Museum of Art.

== Career ==
In 2017, Ryan was hired as an assistant curator at Albright-Knox Art Gallery in Buffalo, New York; and by 2022, she was promoted to curator. Prior to her appointment she previously worked at the New Museum, MoMA PS1, and the Institute of Contemporary Art, Boston. Ryan has researched "time-based media" of the 1960s and 1970s. She has also been involved in the study and research of digital art preservation, including NFTs.

Ryan and co-curator Paul Vanouse organized the 2021 exhibition Difference Machines: Technology and Identity in Contemporary Art at the gallery. The Difference Machines exhibition features 17 artists and has a hybrid display design featuring interactivity, the artwork is technical but also accessible to people without technical knowledge, and it exists as a learning space. A review in The Brooklyn Rail discussed the exhibition's themes of "the use of digital technologies for passive (but not always effective) surveillance, how identities are shaped by technology, the erasure of marginalized communities, and the active reassertion of control."

Other exhibitions at Albright-Knox she has co-curated include Tony Conrad: A Retrospective (2018), and We The People: New Art from the Collection (2018–2019).

In March 2024, Ryan was named the editor-in-chief of Artforum magazine, succeeding David Velasco. Velasco was fired from his role due to supporting Palestinian causes, which sparked a boycott and criticism of Ryan for taking the role. In February 2026, Artforum announced that Ryan will be stepping down as the editor-in-chief of the magazine. Daniel Wenger, a current Artforum editor, and Rachel Wetzler, the magazine’s executive editor, will replace her in the role.

== Publications ==
- Ryan, Tina Rivers (2016). McLuhan's Bulbs: Light Art and the Dawn of New Media. Columbia University.

=== Co-authored or contributed ===
- Schmaltz, Tad M. (2014). "Reflection: Efficient Causation in Art". Efficient Causation: A History. Tina Rivers Ryan (contributor). Oxford University Press. pp. 311–316. ISBN 9780199782178.
- Baum, Kelly; Bradnock, Lucy; Ryan, Tina Rivers (September 12, 2017). Delirious: Art at the Limits of Reason 1950–1980. New York, NY: Metropolitan Museum of Art. ISBN 978-1588396334.
- Hearst, A., Kholeif, O., Ryan, T. R., Suler, J. R., & Modern Art Museum of Fort Worth, host institution. (2023). I’ll be your mirror : art and the digital screen. Modern Art Museum of Fort Worth. ISBN 9781636810959

=== Exhibition-related ===
- Blauvelt, Andrew; Castillo, Greg; Choi, Esther; Clarke, Alison (2015). "Toward a Stroboscopic History". Hippie Modernism: The Struggle for Utopia (art exhibition). Tina Rivers Ryan (contributor). Walker Art Center. p. 380. ISBN 9781935963097.
- Chaffee, Cathleen, ed. (2018). Introducing Tony Conrad: A Retrospective (art exhibition). Rachel Adams (author), Diedrich Diederichsen (author), Branden Wayne Joseph (author), David Grubbs (author), Jay Sanders (author), Constance DeJong (author), Vera Alemani (author), Tina Rivers Ryan (author), Annie Ochmanek (author), Andrew Lampert (author), Christopher Müller (author), Tony Oursler (contributor), Anthony Elms (author), Henriette Huldisch (author), Paige Sarlin (author), Christopher Williams (author). Albright-Knox Art Gallery. ISBN 9783960983361.
- Tenconi, Roberta; Ryan, Tina Rivers (2020). Matt Mullican: Photographs: Catalogue 1971–2018 (art exhibition). James Welling (photographer), Matt Mullican (artist), Anne Rorimer (contributor), Marie-Luise Angerer (contributor). Milan, Italy: Skira and Hangar Bicocca. ISBN 978-8857241173.
- Goodeve, Thyrza Nichols; Ryan, Tina Rivers (January 12, 2021). Art, Engagement, Economy: the Working Practice of Caroline Woolard (art exhibition). Patricia C. Phillips (foreword), D. Burnett (contributor), Alison Burstein (contributor), Stamatina Gregory (contributor), Larissa Harris (contributor), Leigh Claire La Berge (contributor), Stephanie Owens (contributor), Cybele Maylone (contributor), Steven Matijcio (contributor), Sheetal Prajapati (contributor), Caitlin Julia Rubin (contributor), Mierle Ukeles (contributor). Eindhoven, Netherlands: Onomatopee Projects. ISBN 978-9493148345.

== See also ==
- Conservation and restoration of time-based media art
- Digital curation
- Women in the art history field
