= Johanna Burton =

American art historian, critic, and curator (born 1971/1972)

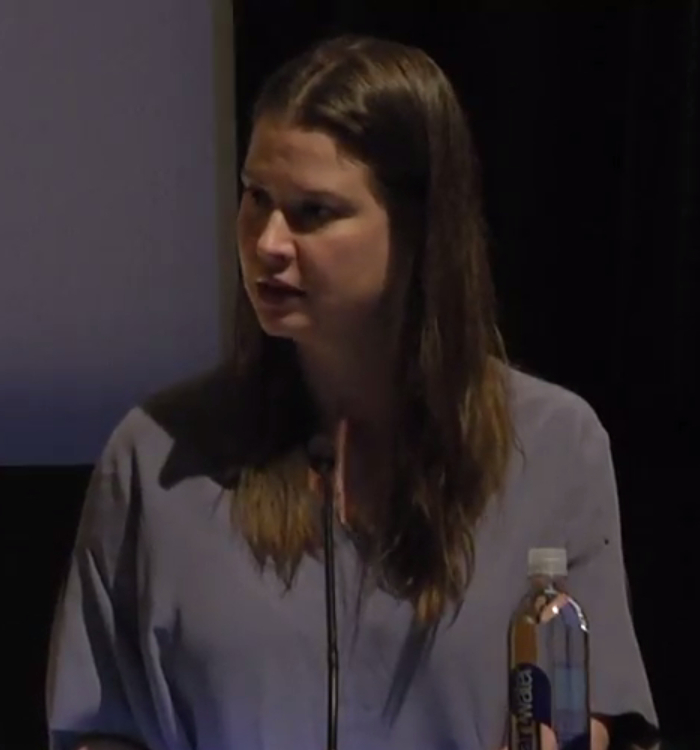
- Johanna Burton in 2017
- Born: Johanna Beth Burton; 1971 or 1972 (age 54–55); Reno, Nevada, United States
- Occupations: Art historian, critic, curator, museum director
- Employer: Institute of Contemporary Art, Philadelphia
- Spouse: Tim Griffin

Johanna Beth Burton is an American art historian, art critic, and curator who is serving as director of the Institute of Contemporary Art, Philadelphia. Burton was director of the Museum of Contemporary Art, Los Angeles, from 2021 to 2025 and Ohio State University's Wexner Center for the Arts from 2018 to 2021.

== Early life and education ==
Johanna Beth Burton was born in 1971 or 1972, and she grew up in Lemmon Valley, Nevada, near Reno. She is named after the Bob Dylan song "Visions of Johanna". She recalls growing up in a "pretty unconventional family" in a relatively low-income area. Her father was a musician and her mother was a painter, and they owned horses and dogs. She spent her childhood horseback riding with her mother as well as learning to install drywall and work with plumbing, and also expressed an early curiosity in feminist ideas, especially feminist art.

Burton studied at Hug High School in Reno. She obtained a bachelor's degree at the University of Nevada, Reno, in 1997, becoming the first student from the school to graduate with a degree in art history. She then moved to New York to study at SUNY Stony Brook. She earned master's degrees from SUNY Stony Brook, New York University, and Princeton University. At Princeton, she studied with art critic Hal Foster. She wrote art criticism through her studies and early roles in intern and adjunct positions.

== Career ==
Burton was a curatorial fellow at the New Museum in New York City in 2002. She served as associate director and a faculty member of the Whitney Museum's Independent Study Program from 2008 to 2010. From 2010 to 2013, she was director of the graduate program at the Bard College's Center for Curatorial Studies and Art in Contemporary Culture, after which she continued to serve as a faculty member. Her position at Bard College ended in a group show called "Anti-Establishment", featuring artists who, in her words, work with "novel collective relationships and emergent models of engaged citizenship." The Emily Hall Tremaine Foundation awarded her a $150,000 grant in 2012 to support her exhibition "Slow Dance". She curated a 2011 exhibition on Sherrie Levine at the Whitney Museum, and with curator Anne Ellegood, she guest-curated a 2014 exhibition at the Hammer Museum on critique and appropriation. She also curated exhibitions for artists Simone Leigh and Haim Steinbach.

In 2013, Burton returned to the New Museum to become director and curator of its education and public programs, succeeding Eungie Joo. She was curator of the 2017 exhibition "Trigger: Gender as a Tool and a Weapon", which features work by 40 artists of different generations which explores gender beyond the gender binary. The New York Times described it as the largest show at a major museum to explore gender fluidity.

The Wexner Center for the Arts at Ohio State University named Burton as its director in 2018, following the departure of Sherri Geldin. She was selected as a 2019 Center for Curatorial Leadership Fellowship. In late 2021, she was named executive director of the Museum of Contemporary Art in Los Angeles. Burton was to lead the MOCA with museum director Klaus Biesenbach, but she was named director two weeks later when Biesenbach quit the museum.

On October 31, 2024, the Andy Warhol Foundation for the Visual Arts announced that Burton had been appointed to the board.

In July 2025, it was announced that Burton would become director of the Institute of Contemporary Art, Philadelphia, in November. She left MOCA in July 2025.

== Personal life ==
Burton is married to Tim Griffin, former editor-in-chief of Artforum magazine and a former executive director and curator of The Kitchen in New York.
