= Michelle Kuo =

American curator, writer, and art historian

- Born: 1977 or 1978 (age 47–48)
- Education: Stanford University (BA); Harvard University (PhD)
- Occupations: curator, writer, and art historian
- Organization: Museum of Modern Art

Michelle Kuo (born 1977 or 1978) is an American curator, writer, and art historian. Since 2018, Kuo has been a curator of painting and sculpture at the Museum of Modern Art. She was previously editor-in-chief of Artforum magazine starting in 2010.

== Education ==
Kuo graduated from Stanford University with a Bachelor of Arts in art history and political science. She then earned a Ph.D. in the history of art and architecture from Harvard University in 2017. She wrote her doctoral dissertation at Harvard under Yve-Alain Bois on the art group Experiments in Art and Technology. As a graduate student at Harvard, she co-curated a show on the works of architect Le Corbusier at the university's Carpenter Center for the Visual Arts on the occasion of the Carpenter Center's 40th anniversary in 2004.

== Career ==
From 2005 to 2007, Kuo was the Wyeth Predoctoral Fellow at the Center for Advanced Study in the Visual Arts at the National Gallery of Art in Washington D.C. Kuo became senior editor of Artforum magazine in March 2008 while a PhD candidate at Harvard. In April 2010, she became editor-in-chief, replacing Tim Griffin. In this position, she edited issues on the subjects of political art, race, gender, and revolution. Columbia Journalism Review credited Kuo for shifting the magazine towards an academic direction with issues focused on identity politics and the place of art in daily life. In 2015, she acted as an advisor on the Salzburg Museum of Modern Art exhibition Experiments in Art and Technology. Kuo resigned from her post at Artforum in October 2017, ending her tenure with the January 2018 issue, following reports of alleged sexual harassment by one of the magazine's publishers. Artforum web editor David Velasco succeeded Kuo as editor-in-chief.

In February 2018, Kuo was appointed the Marlene Hess Curator of Painting and Sculpture at the Museum of Modern Art (MoMA) in New York City. In early 2019, she organized the exhibition New Order: Art and Technology in the Twenty-First Century, which showcases "sprawling installations, canny video art or interactive sculptures" that were "made with technologies most of us already know and love (or hate)", as The New York Times art critic Martha Schwendener writes. A review in The New Yorker called New Order "superb" and praised Kuo's "deep" knowledge of the subject and "agile approach".

Working with New York painter Amy Sillman, Kuo organized the exhibition The Shape of Shape for the reopening of the museum in late 2019 following renovations. The exhibition showcased works chosen from the MoMA's holdings by Sillman and is an installment in the museum's "Artist's Choice" exhibition series, in which an invited artist organizes an exhibition with any works from its collection. The New Yorker art editor Andrea K. Scott described the exhibition as an "exciting expression of the ethos of the newly renovated MOMA."

Kuo served on the juries that awarded the Lise Wilhelmsen Art Award to Otobong Nkanga in 2019 and to Guadalupe Maravilla in 2021 as well as the Serpentine x FLAG Art Foundation Prize to Gozo Yoshimasu in 2026.

Kuo and Stuart Comer were curators of the 2023 exhibition "Signals: How Video Transformed the World," MoMA's largest exhibition of video art.

In March 2025, Kuo led the team behind MoMA's acclaimed show "Jack Whitten: The Messenger," the first full-career survey exhibit of the work of American abstract painter and sculptor Jack Whitten.

== Personal life ==
Kuo is Chinese American. She recalls her uncle was the first artist whose work interested her, having grown up with his works in her home. Her uncle initially planned to study physics after emigrating from Taiwan, but ultimately became an artist and illustrator and moved to Nashville to create "everything from country music album covers to paintings addressing Chinese American identity."

== See also ==
- Women in the art history field
