= Seth Price =

American visual artist

Seth Price (born 1973 in East Jerusalem) is a New York City-based multi-disciplinary post-conceptual artist. He lives and works in New York City.

== Early life ==
Price was born in the village of Sheikh Jarrah in East Jerusalem in 1973. His parents had travelled to Sheikh Jarrah on behalf of the Quaker organization American Friends Service Committee and established a legal aid clinic for the local Palestinian population. Price lived there until he was two years old. Price then moved to Boston, Massachusetts, where he attended Brookline public schools. He later attended Brown University where he received his BA in 1998.

Price has described his ethnic heritage as "Welsh/Greek/American WASP."

== Writing ==
Recently, Price published "Machine Time" in Heavy Traffic 1; in a year's end roundup in The Paris Review assistant editor Olivia Kan-Sperling cited it as "the best fiction I read this year;" it was also acclaimed in Interview Magazine. In 2020, Price published the poetry book Dedicated to Life, which was conceived as a part of a gallery exhibition at Isabella Bortolozzi. Steve Zultanski called it one of his "favourite recent poetry books" in an article for Spike Magazine.

In 2015 Price published the novel Fuck Seth Price. Before publication, an excerpt appeared in Harper's Magazine and it was part of The Believer Magazine's "favorite fiction of 2015". In 2015, writing for the New York Times Style Magazine, musician/artist Kim Gordon named it as one of her favorite books, calling it "the best description of the art world ever."

Price published How to Disappear in America in 2008 and it was adapted into a musical by Ei Arakawa.

Price published Dispersion in 2002 as a self-published booklet. It has been translated into 7 languages and been bootlegged in a variety of ways, including a "Cult Classic" version from Burn Rate Berlin, which includes Kanye West "Wisdom Quotes" interspersed throughout.

Talking to the Believer 10 years after Dispersion's initial publication Price said "I started writing that essay not because of any interest in the internet, but out of frustration about how to be an artist, or whether I even should "be" one. Is it possible to make objects anymore? Is that interesting? So really it was my thinking through how to enter this other world, and when I finished it, I thought the text itself might be a piece."

== Music ==
Price has released cassettes, CDs, vinyl LPs and files through labels that include Audio Visual Arts, Dais Records, Period Tapes, Free103point9 and Distributed History. In 2012 his 2002 CD Army Jacket was re-released in a 10-year anniversary vinyl pressing. Montez Press Radio, broadcast a 24-hour marathon of Price's original music April 20, 2020.

== Other projects ==
The film Redistribution (2007-ongoing) had a week-long theatrical run at New York's Metrograph Cinema in September 2019.

In 2015 Price was hired by clothing company Brioni to model for its Fall/Winter ad campaign. A photograph by Collier Schorr of this advertisement appearing in the New Yorker was used as the cover design of the second edition of Fuck Seth Price.

In 2015 Price created Organic Software a website providing algorithmically-mined data on prominent art collectors and their political donations. Originally intending to remain anonymous, Price was revealed as the creator of the site by Vice Magazine in 2017. Writing for Texte zur Kunst in 2017, Price recounts taking a year's hiatus from the art world: shutting down his studio and attempting to write a young adult novel while pursuing the "dumb goal" of removing traces of himself from the internet. At the end of the hiatus and in an attempt to "bend my frustration toward something productive" Price wrote the autofiction novel "Fuck Seth Price" to which organic.software served as a companion piece.

In 2011 during Mens Fashion Week, Price debuted a line of military-inspired garments, designed with Tim Hamilton, in a vacant storefront in downtown New York. The garment line was developed further for a presentation at Documenta 13 in Kassel, Germany, in 2012, where he staged a fashion show in the town's underground parking garage.

== Reception and interpretation ==
Novelist Rachel Kushner called Price's work a "Vision so accurate it becomes fiction." Art critic Tom Moody described his 2009 Art F City essay Teen Image as "entertaining but incoherent." In 2018 art critic Andrew Russeth described Price's show, Seth Price: Hell Has Everything at Petzel Gallery as one of the “weirdest shows of the year” and said that “it feels like such an exacting depiction of life in New York right now.”

Price has described a major theme in his work as "the tension between material life and dematerialized life," and spoken of it as a response to the last twenty years’ "trend of increasing abstraction... in finance, the distancing of technology, and the effects of digital tools. Social media accelerates that, and moves it to the realm of the self, where we’re being asked to live in the material and immaterial realms at the same moment." In The Brooklyn Rail, Price said of his "Silhouettes" series: "I never wanted people to look at the 'Silhouettes' and understand how fucking annoying it is to unite plastic and wood. I wanted it to look like that process always existed."

Between 2013 and 2014 Price took a year away from doing shows and other art world activities. Around the same time, he tried to have all press, interviews and photos of him removed from the internet. Some critics have interpreted this attempt as a work in its own right; however, when asked about it in an interview with Kim Gordon for Bomb magazine, Price said: “I never really called it a work. I just thought I would try it.”

Price has spoken about dropping out of social media, distrusting the cloud, and the importance of avoiding predictability.

== Art market ==
Seth Price is represented by Reena Spaulings Fine Art and Friedrich Petzel Gallery in New York City, Galerie Chantal Crousal, Paris; Galerie Gisela Capitain, Cologne; Galerie Isabella Bortolozzi, Berlin; and Capitain Petzel, Berlin. At a 2014 Christie's auction in New York, a golden, vacuum formed polystyrene piece by Price called Vintage Bomber (2006) sold for $785,000, sweeping past its high estimate of $70,000.

== Honors and awards ==
In 2020 Price, was honored at a benefit hosted by Rhizome.

Price has been part of board of directors for Artists Space since 2009.

Seth Price was the subject of a one-year research program from 2017 to 2018 at the Wattis Institute in San Francisco, called "Seth Price is on Our Mind," which included a regular private study group as well as a series of public events, activities, talks and commissioned essays.

Seth Price was honored at Printed Matter's first annual benefit in 2017.

Price received the Golden Lion Award at the Biennial de Lyon in 2007.

== Partial exhibition history ==
=== Solo exhibitions ===
In 2017 the ICA London presented a survey of Price's film and video works co-curated by the Institute's director Stefan Kalmár, Richard Birkett and Stuart Bertolotti-Bailey. Price opted not to be involved in the planning and installation of the show, later explaining that he asked to be treated "as a dead artist."

In 2017 Price was the subject of a survey exhibition of 17 years of work at the Stedilijk Museum, Amsterdam, curated by Beatrix Ruf and Achim Höchdorfer. The exhibition then travelled to Museum Brandhorst, Munich."

Further solo exhibitions include:

2016

- Wrok, Fmaily, Freidns, 356 Mission Rd, Los Angeles

2015

- Drawings: Studies for Works 2000–2015, Petzel Gallery, New York

2014

- Animation Studio, Galerie Chantal Crousel, Paris
- Eden Eden, Berlin

2013

- Steh Pirce, Reena Spaulings Fine Art, New York
- Galerie Gisela Capitain, Cologne

2012

- Folklore U.S., Petzel Gallery, New York

2011

- Miam!, Galerie Chantal Crousel, Paris
- Non Speech, Fire and Smoke, Friedrich Petzel Gallery, New York

2010

- Die Nuller Jahre, Capitain Petzel and Galerie Isabella Bortolozzi, Berlin

2009

- Reena Spaulings Fine Art, New York
- Museo d'Arte Moderna di Bologna, Bologna

2008

- Kunsthalle Zurich, Zurich; Kölnischer Kunstverein, Cologne
- Petzel Gallery, New York

2007

- Modern Art Oxford, Oxford (with Kelley Walker and Continuous Project)
- Tricks, Galerie Gisela Capitain, Cologne

2006

- Friedrich Petzel Gallery/Reena Spaulings Fine Art/Electronic Arts Intermix, New York
- Sculpture, Galerie Isabella Bortolozzi, Berlin

2004

- Reena Spaulings Fine Art, New York
- Archives Generations Upon, organized by Wade Guyton, Year, New York (with Mai-Thu Perret)

=== Group exhibitions ===
Price's work exhibits internationally and was included in the 2002 and 2008 Whitney Biennials, the Venice Biennale in 2011 and dOCUMENTA (13) in 2012.

In 2005, Price curated "Grey Flags" at Friedrich Petzel Gallery, a group show including Richard Artschwager, Wade Guyton, Georg Herold, Joan Jonas, and David Lieske.

== Bibliography ==
- Books of Ice (Los Angeles: Ooga Booga, 2016)
- Fuck Seth Price. New York: Leopard Press. 2015
- "Lecture on the Extra Part," Texte Zur Kunst, no. 99 (September 2015)
- Nothing More (published to distributedhistory.com, 2015)
- How to Disappear in America, 3rd ed., Leopard Press, New York, 2015
- Drawings: Studies For Works 2000–2015, Petzel Gallery, New York, Koenig, London, 2015
- Folklore U.S. Published by Koenig Books Ltd., Serpentine Gallery, London. 2014
- 2000 Words Published by The DESTE Foundation for Contemporary Art. 2014
- Wade Guyton, Seth Price Photographic Objects. Kehrer, Heidelberg, Berlin. 2012
- How to Disappear in America, 2nd ed., Leopard Press, New York, 2011
- Price, Seth. Published by JRP | Ringier. 2010
- Was Ist Los, 38th Street Publishers, 2010
- Die Nuller Jahre, Press Release, Capitain Petzel, Berlin, 2010
- Teen Image (first published to artfcity.com, 2009)
- Seth Price: Museo D'Arte Moderna Di Bologna. Museo D'Arte Moderna Di Bologna, Bologna. 2009
- For a Friend, New York: Reena Spaulings Fine Art. 2009
- How to Disappear in America. New York: Leopard Press. 2008
- Freelance Stenographer, with Kelley Walker, self-published, 2007
- Guyton, Price, Smith, Walker, ed. Beatrix Ruf, exh. cat., Kunsthalle Zurich, Zurich (self-published, 2007)
- “8-4 9-5 10-6 11-7”, 2nd ed., New York for Parcours 2014, Art Basel 45, Petzel, 2007
- Continuous Project #12, ed. Suzanne Cotter (London: Modern Art Oxford, 2007)
- Continuous Project #8, ed. Bettina Funcke (Paris: CNEAI, 2006)
- Continuous Project #7 (Vienna: Parabol AM, 2006)
- Grey Flags, ed. Bettina Funcke, New York: Sculpture Center, 2006
- Continuous Project Bulletin #1–7 (Paris: CNEAI, 2006)
- Notes on This Show (self-published, 2006)
- Décor Holes, self-published and distributed with Akademische, 2003–5, Décor Holes LP, 2006
- People with No Heads v. People with the Heads of Animals, Pacemaker 11, Toastink Press, Paris, 2006
- 1000 Words: Joan Jonas, Artforum, November 2006, pp. 270–271
- Industrielle Faust (Psychose), Spike Art Quarterly, p. 111, 2005
- “Sports,” The Uncertain States of America Reader, American Art in the 3rd Millennium, Astrup Fearnley Museum of Modern Art, Oslo, pp. 86–87, 2005
- Sports, NYFA Current (nyfa.org), June 15, 2005
- “Source unique le clan du suicide ‘Au natural,’” in Packaging, Forde, Geneva, 2005
- Poems. One Star Press, Paris. 2004
- Three in One Book (with Josh Smith), self-published, 2004
- Global Taste, with Josh Smith, self-published, 2004
- OK, Just Send Me the Bill, self-published, 2004
- Was Ist Los. Published by 38th Street Publishers. 2003–05
- Untitled Black Book, with Josh Smith, self-published, 2003
- Stay At Home/Go Home, published to distributedhistory.com, 2003
- Christophe Cherix, 2003; reprinted, Greene Naftali, New York, 2003
- "Various Artists: NJS Megamix,”, Sound Collector Audio Review, no. 3, 2003
- Dispersion. self-published to distributedhistory.com, 2002
- Industrial Synth, “New Work/New York”, Museum of Modern Art, 2001

== Discography ==
- Zero Bow Childreeen (2021 reissue), 2021.
- Zero Bow Childreeen, Black vinyl LP (Edition of 500), special release with Spike, 2021.
- Casual Holiday Mix (cassette), 2020.
- White Moods, 2016.
- Folklore U.S., (compact disc), exh. dOCUMENTA 13, Petzel Gallery, New York 2012.
- Army Jacket, (Vinyl LP reissue), Dais Records, New York & Los Angeles, 2012.
- Honesty, (Vinyl), AVA Records, New York, 2011.
- Seth Price Fashion, 2011.
- Sines, (cassette reissue), 2010.
- Akademische Graffiti, (compact disc), Frac Aquitaine, 2009.
- Seth Price & Stefan Tcherepnin, 2007.
- Waves, 2006.
- New Age According to Seth Price, 2006.
- Working Music, 2005.
- Industrial Fist, (compact disc project), Free103point9, 2004.
- New Jack Swing (compact disc project) self-published 2002, republished by Free103point9.
- Directions, 2002.
- Iron Curtain Girl, 2002.
- Modern Suite, 2002.
- Revolting Cocks, Sound Collector Audio Review 4, 2004.
- Industrial Fist, 2003.
- Various Artists: NJS Megamix, Sound Collector Audio Review, no. 3, 2003.
- Darkness XP, 2003.
- New York Woman, (compact disc) 2001.
- Game Heaven (compact disc project), self-published, 2001.
- Policier, (cassette) 1998.
- Curiositas, (cassette) 1996.
