= Artforum =

Magazine on contemporary art

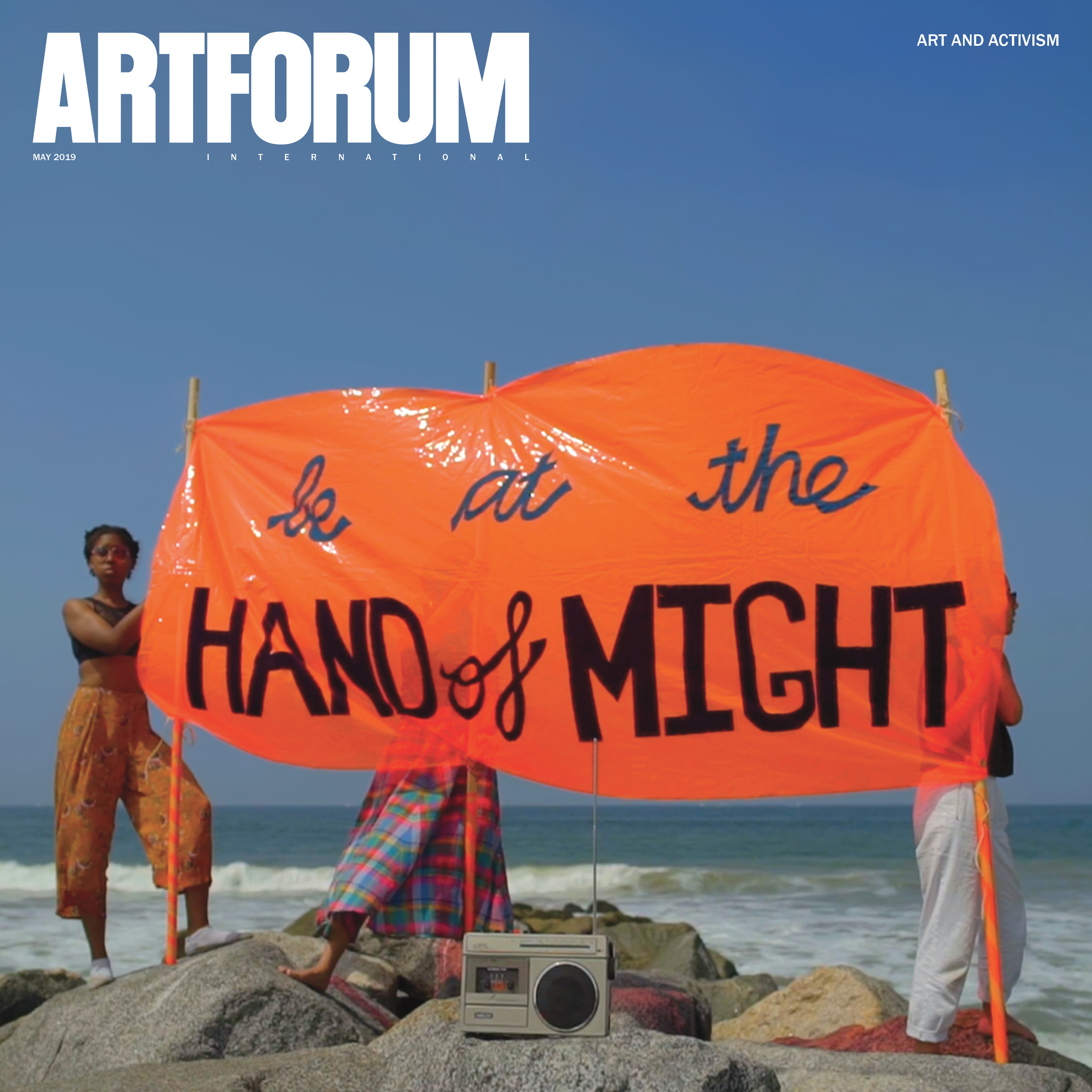
- May 2019 Artforum cover
- Co-editors: Rachel Wetzler, Daniel Wenger (2026-)
- Former editors: Jack Bankowsky, John Coplans, Tim Griffin, Michelle Kuo, Philip Leider, Tina Rivers Ryan, Ingrid Sischy, David Velasco
- Categories: art magazine
- Frequency: Monthly
- Founder: John P. Irwin Jr.
- Founded: 1962; 64 years ago
- Company: Artforum Media, LLC (Penske Media Corporation)
- Country: United States
- Based in: New York City
- Language: English
- Website: artforum.com
- ISSN: 0004-3532

Artforum is an international monthly magazine specializing in contemporary art. The magazine is distinguished from other magazines by its unique 10½ × 10½ inch square format, with each cover often devoted to the work of an artist. Notably, the Artforum logo is a bold and condensed iteration of the Akzidenz-Grotesk font, a feat for an American publication to have considering how challenging it was to obtain fonts favored by the Swiss school via local European foundries in the 1960s. Artforum is published by Artforum Media, LLC, a subsidiary of Penske Media Corporation.

John P. Irwin Jr. named the magazine after the ancient Roman word forum hoping to capture the similarity of the Roman marketplace to the art world's lively engagement with public debate and commercial exchange. The magazine features in-depth articles and reviews of contemporary art, as well as book reviews, columns on cinema and popular culture, personal essays, commissioned artworks and essays, and numerous full-page advertisements from prominent galleries around the world.

== History ==
Artforum was founded in San Francisco in 1962 by John P. Irwin Jr. Irwin was a salesman for Pisani Printing Company and would make frequent stops to the galleries around Brannan Street and the Financial District for deliveries. Gallery curators and artists, like Philip Leider, suggested to Irwin that he should start a local arts publication that catered to the West Coast arts scene since they were tired of reading about the same New York-based artists in Art in America, Arts Magazine, and Art News. Through the backing of Pisani Printing Company, Irwin successfully launched the magazine in a small office off of Howard Street. The first issue featured a cover with a work by the kinetic sculpture by Swiss painter Jean Tinguely suggesting the inchoate and indistinct identity of the fledgling publication. "That center section will contain a lot of divergent and contradictory opinion[s]", reads an editorial note in the first issue.

The next publisher/owner Charles Cowles moved the magazine to Los Angeles in 1965 before finally settling it in New York City in 1967, where it maintains offices today. The move to New York also encompassed a shift in the style of work championed by the magazine, moving away from California style art to late modernism, then the leading style of art in New York City. One of Leider's final essays for the magazine, "How I Spent My Summer Vacation, or, Art and Politics in Nevada, Berkeley, San Francisco and Utah", is a reflective first-person account of a cross-country road trip visiting earthworks, such as Michael Heizer's Double Negative (1969) and Robert Smithson's Spiral Jetty (1970). The essay grapples with the relationship between politics and art.

During Leider's tenure, Artforum included a variety of critical positions. From 1967 to 1971, these views were debated in the ten-part series of columns called "Problems of Criticism". It began with Robert Goldwater's overview of the state of art writing, then featured Clement Greenberg defending an exclusively formal method of interpretation, which was then critiqued by younger contributors such as Barbara Rose, Jack Burnham, and Rosalind Krauss. After fifty-five years, an eleventh part was published in 2026 by Harmon Siegel, which argued that criticism has no choice but to be political even when avowing a formalist method.

The departure of Philip Leider as editor-in-chief in 1971 and the tenure of John Coplans as the new editor-in-chief roughly coincided with a shift towards more fashionable trends and away from late modernism. A focus on minimal art, conceptual art, body art, land art and performance art provided a platform for artists such as Robert Smithson, Donald Judd, Sol LeWitt and others. In 1980, after opening his own gallery in New York City, Charles Cowles divested himself of the magazine. A sister magazine, Bookforum, was started in 1994.

In 2003, the Columbia-Bard graduate Tim Griffin became the editor-in-chief of the magazine. He sought to bring back a serious tone and invited a mix of academics, artists, and cultural critics to contribute to thematic issues on such topics as globalism, performance, art and commerce, and the contemporary museum. Theorists and curators like Giorgio Agamben, Alain Badiou, Judith Butler, Okwui Enwezor, Toni Negri, and Jacques Rancière were featured with now-anthologized essays by Glenn Ligon and Andrea Fraser. The magazine shed light on a new emergence of digital neo-appropriation artists such as Wade Guyton, Seth Price, and Kelley Walker and featured covers by artists including Dara Birnbaum, Paul Chan, Michael Clark, Barkley L. Hendricks, Amy Sillman, and Danh Vō.

Michelle Kuo, a PhD candidate at Harvard and respected critic, was announced as the editor-in-chief in 2010 after Tim Griffin resigned to pursue other work. The magazine followed a similar, sober tone of under its new leadership with round-table discussions, book and exhibition reviews, and lively hyper-academic discourse. In October 2017, publisher Knight Landesman resigned in the wake of allegations of sexual misconduct with nine women including a former employee who filed a lawsuit. Artforum initially backed Landesman, saying the allegations were "unfounded" and suggested that lawsuit was "an attempt to exploit a relationship that she herself worked hard to create and maintain." The magazine's editor Michelle Kuo resigned at the end of the year in response to the publishers' handling of the allegations. Kuo released a statement in Artnews noting, "We need to make the art world a more equitable, just, and safe place for women at all levels. And that can only be achieved when organizations and communities are bound by shared trust, honesty, and accountability." Artforum staff released a statement condemning the way the publishers had handled the allegations.

A new era of Artforum emerged under the leadership of David Velasco in January 2018. In his first issue, featuring a self-portrait by the born HIV-positive artist Kia LaBeija, Velasco wrote a poignant statement: "The art world is misogynist. Art history is misogynist. Also racist, classist, transphobic, ableist, homophobic. I will not accept this. Intersectional feminism is an ethics near and dear to so many on our staff. Our writers too. This is where we stand. There's so much to be done. Now, we get to work." Art critic Jerry Saltz immediately praised the new direction the magazine had taken, noting, "And just like that, an Artforum that needed to disappear was gone." The new editorial direction included writing and photographic essays by Molly Nesbit, philosopher and curator Paul B. Preciado, critic Johanna Fatemen, and artists such as Donald Moffett.

Artist Nan Goldin published a harrowing text and photographic account of her addiction to the prescription pain-relief drug OxyContin in a 2018 piece that prompted the founding of P.A.I.N., a campaign to expose the role of Purdue Pharma and the Sackler family in the opioid epidemic in America. This campaign coincided with Christopher Glazek's breaking report in Esquire and several weeks later Patrick Radden Keefe's report in The New Yorker on the Sacklers' "criminal misbranding." Both journalists reported that the drug that led doctors to believe Oxycontin was less addictive that had been reported. Goldin demanded in her essay that the Sacklers donate half of their fortune to drug rehabilitation clinics and programs. Thessaly La Force of The New York Times Style Magazine wrote of the artist, "It is rare these days to see a lone artist like Goldin — especially one both critically and commercially successful, whose work is in dozens of important museum collections, including the Metropolitan Museum of Art and the Museum of Modern Art — step into the ring as an activist."

In 2019, Hannah Black, Ciarán Finlayson, and Tobi Haslett published an essay in Artforum titled "The Tear Gas Biennial", decrying Warren Kanders, co-chair of the board of the Whitney Museum, and his "toxic philanthropy." Although Kanders had donated an estimated $10 million to the museum, the source of his fortune comes from Safariland LLC, a company that manufactures riot gear, tear gas and other chemical weapons used by police and the military to impose order by force. Although the Geneva Convention in 1925 outlawed the use of tear gas in all international military conflict, the tear gas fired at peaceful protesters and civilians by the police and military during the George Floyd protests in 2020 as well as on migrants on the US-Mexico border is the same brand of tear gas manufactured by Defense Technology, a subsidy of Safariland. A wave of artists from the Biennial, including Korakrit Arunanondchai, Meriem Bennani, Nicole Eisenman and Nicholas Galanin, demanded immediate removal of their work from the Biennial within hours after the essay was published. After mounting pressure from artists, critics, and gallerists urging the public to boycott the show, Kanders stepped down from his leadership position at the museum. The essay was instrumental in his resignation, and in the museum cutting ties with Kanders' financial endowments that were directly connected to the promotion and use of military weaponry and violence during peaceful social unrest.

In December 2022, Artforum was acquired by Penske Media.

=== Open letter about Palestine and Israel ===
On October 19, 2023, in the aftermath of the 2023 Hamas-led attack on Israel, Artforum published an open letter signed by roughly 8,000 artists and cultural workers that expressed support for Palestinian nationalism in response to the Gaza war. Some of these artists included Nan Goldin, Peter Doig, and Kara Walker. Specifically, the letter pressured national governments to support a ceasefire and humanitarian aid in the Gaza Strip. A key passage from the letter is as follows.

We support Palestinian liberation and call for an end to the killing and harming of all civilians, an immediate ceasefire, the passage of humanitarian aid into Gaza, and the end of the complicity of our governing bodies in grave human rights violations and war crimes.

The following day, Artforum published a letter from art dealers Dominique Lévy, Brett Gorvy, and Amalia Dayan (granddaughter of Israeli military leader Moshe Dayan), which criticized the magazine for not explicitly denouncing Hamas' October 7 attacks on Israelis. Many artists condemned the petition for not mentioning the October 7 attacks.

In response to media pressure leading some artists to withdraw their signatures from the original letter, the Chilean poet and artist Cecilia Vicuña commented that "tampering with the opinions of artists is to not understand the role of art". On October 23, the magazine's website amended the letter to denounce Hamas' violence and hostage-taking. The Intercept investigated modern art curator Martin Eisenberg's campaign to pressure artists into retracting their signatures. Vanity Fair similarly reported that Lucas Zwirner, the son of art dealer David Zwirner, supported the Lévy–Gorvy–Dayan response letter and stopped purchasing advertising from the magazine.

On October 26, Artforum's publisher stated that the October 19 letter was published without the typical editorial process, suggesting that the letter should have been presented in the news section with relevant context on the 2023 Gaza war. The same day, The New York Times reported that editor-in-chief David Velasco had been fired, leading to the resignations of senior editors Zack Hatfield and Chloe Wyma. Documentarian Laura Poitras, musician Brian Eno, artists Barbara Kruger and Nicole Eisenman, philosopher Judith Butler, academic Saidiya Hartman, and photographer Nan Goldin signed the original letter and called for a boycott of Artforum in response to Velasco being fired. They praised his leadership increasing the magazine's prominence and denounced Velasco's firing as limiting their free speech.

As the magazine and its sister publications ARTnews and Art in America lacked editorial leadership, the December 2023 "Year in Review" issue of Artforum was trimmed because critic Jennifer Krasinski, art historian Claire Bishop, filmmaker John Waters, curator Meg Onli, and artist Gordon Hall withdrew their writing from the magazine in protest of Velasco's firing. The following March, Tina Rivers Ryan was named editor-in-chief.

== On Artforum ==
- A book by Amy Newman chronicling the early history of the magazine, Challenging Art: Artforum 1962–1974, was published by Soho Press in 2000.
- Sarah Thornton's documentary book Seven Days in the Art World (2008) contains a chapter titled "The Magazine" which is set in the offices of Artforum. In it, Thornton says, "Artforum is to art what Vogue is to fashion and Rolling Stone was to rock and roll. It's a trade magazine with crossover cachet and an institution with controversial clout."

== Notable contributors ==
Note: Please keep the names in alphabetical order when adding yours to the lists. Thank you.

- Hilton Als
- Walter Darby Bannard
- Dodie Bellamy
- Andrew Berardini
- Maurice Berger
- Hannah Black
- Yve-Alain Bois
- Lizzie Borden
- Dennis Cooper
- Arthur C. Danto
- John Elderfield
- Manny Farber
- Hal Foster
- Michael Fried
- Christopher Glazek
- RoseLee Goldberg
- Nan Goldin
- Kim Gordon
- Clement Greenberg
- Tobi Haslett
- Dave Hickey
- A. M. Homes
- Gary Indiana
- Alex Jovanovich
- Travis Jeppesen
- Donald Judd
- Wayne Koestenbaum
- Max Kozloff
- Rosalind Krauss
- Rachel Kushner
- Thomas Lawson
- Ben Lerner
- Tao Lin
- Lucy Lippard
- Greil Marcus
- Annette Michelson
- Robert Morris
- Sarah Nicole Prickett
- James Quandt
- Barbara Rose
- Roberta Smith
- Robert Smithson
- Amy Taubin
- Eugenio Viola
- Edmund White

== Editors-in-chief ==
- Philip Leider (June 1962–December 1971) (Note: Philip Leider left the magazine at the end of the Summer 1971 issue, but remained on the masthead until December 1971.)
- John Coplans (January 1972–January 1977)
- In February 1977, Nancy Foote operated as the managing editor without a head editor
- Joseph Masheck (March 1977–January 1980)
- Ingrid Sischy (February 1980–February 1988)
- Ida Panicelli (March 1988–Summer 1992)
- Jack Bankowsky (September 1992–Summer 2003)
- Tim Griffin (September 2003–Summer 2010)
- Michelle Kuo (September 2010–December 2017)
- David Velasco (January 2018–October 2023)
- Tina Rivers Ryan (March 2024–May 2026)
- Rachel Wetzler and Daniel Wenger (May 2026-)
