= Gretch =

Gretch may refer to:

== People ==
- Gretch, nickname of Grethcel Soltones (born 1995), Filipina volleyball player
- Paul Gretch, a co-recipient of the 2018 L. Welch Pogue Award for Lifetime Achievement in Aviation

== Fictional characters ==
- Gretch Gravey, villain of 300,000,000, a 2014 novel
- Gretch, a police inspector in the 1898 opera Fedora and its film adaptations
- Gretchen, a main character nicknamed "The Gretch" in Camp Lakebottom, a Canadian animated television series

== See also ==
- Gretchen Whitmer (born 1971), American politician and lawyer nicknamed "Big Gretch"
- Gretsch
