= Linda Yablonsky =

American writer

- Occupation: Writer
- Writing career
- Language: English
- Genres: Fiction, criticism
- Notable work: The Story of Junk

Linda Yablonsky is a novelist, art critic, and journalist. She has written for the New York Times, Artforum,, Frieze, and The Art Newspaper, among others.

== Work ==
A graduate of New York University, she has contributed to monographs on artists including Anish Kapoor, Keith Sonnier, Marilyn Minter, Francesco Vezzoli, Elmgreen & Dragset, and Mark Morrisroe. Her novel The Story of Junk was first excerpted in the New York Times and published in 1997 by Farrar Straus & Giroux. It will be reissued in 2027 by Enigma Editions, the successor to Archway Editions distributed by Penguin Random House. She is currently working on a biography of Jeff Koons.

== Bibliography ==
=== Fiction ===
- The Story of Junk (1997). Hardcover, Farrar, Straus & Giroux ISBN 978-0374270247
