= Archway Editions =

Independent book publisher based in New York

- Founded: 2019
- Founders: Chris Molnar and Nic Nicoludis
- Defunct: 2025
- Headquarters location: Brooklyn, NY
- Distribution: Simon & Schuster
- Publication types: Books
- Official website: archwayeditions.us

Archway Editions was a publisher based in Brooklyn, New York. It was founded in 2019 by Chris Molnar and Nic Nicoludis, and run with senior editor Naomi Falk as the literary imprint of powerHouse Books, distributed by Simon & Schuster.

== History ==
Archway Editions was created to publish "more off-beat, hard-to-market work — like Ishmael Reed's The Haunting of Lin-Manuel Miranda", as described in Brooklyn Magazine. Their books were excerpted or covered in BOMB, Bookforum, The New York Review of Books, The Paris Review, The New Yorker, and more. In 2024, The New York Times wrote that Blake Butler’s Molly "is in its fourth printing and has become an unexpected hit for Archway Editions, its small Brooklyn-based publisher". In September 2025, the staff posted a letter online announcing that the entire staff stepped down, including Molnar, Nicoludis, Falk, and publicist Mia Risher.

In 2026 the staff announced a new imprint, Enigma Editions, distributed by Penguin Random House through MIT Press. The first slate of authors from Enigma will include Ishmael Reed, Linda Yablonsky, and Carlos Reygadas.

== Publications ==
- The Haunting of Lin-Manuel Miranda, Ishmael Reed (2020) - Drama
- Unpublishable, ed. Chris Molnar and Etan Nechin (2020) - Fiction/Poetry/Non-fiction
- Acid Virga, Gabriel Kruis (2020) - Poetry
- NDA: An Autofiction Anthology, ed. Caitlin Forst (2022) - Fiction
- Bimboland, Erin Taylor (2022) - Poetry
- cokemachineglow, ed. Clayton Purdom (2022) - Non-fiction
- Life Among the Aryans, Ishmael Reed (2022) - Drama
- Famous Hermits, Stacy Szymaszek (2023) - Poetry
- First Reformed, Paul Schrader (2023) - Drama
- Runes and Chords, Alice Notley (2023) - Poetry/Art
- Highway B: Horrorfest, Brantly Martin (2023) - Fiction
- Randy, Mike Sacks (2023) - Fiction
- Stinker Lets Loose, Mike Sacks (2023) - Fiction
- Archways 1, ed. Chris Molnar and Nic Nicoludis (2023) - Fiction/Poetry/Non-fiction
- Molly, Blake Butler (2023) - Non-fiction
- Kind Mirrors, Ugly Ghosts, Claire Donato (2023) - Fiction/Literary
- The Slave Who Loved Caviar, Ishmael Reed (2023) - Drama
- Gay Heaven Is a Dance Floor but I Can't Relax, charles theonia (2024) - Poetry
- Plat, Lindsey Webb (2024) - Poetry
- Void Corporation, Blake Butler (2024) - Fiction/Literary
- Last Poems, John Farris (2025) - Poetry/Art
- The Mystery of Perception, Lynne Tillman and Taylor Lewandowski (2025) - Non-fiction
- Such Times, Christopher Coe (2025) - Fiction/Literary
- Little Pink Book, Olivia Kan-Sperling (2025) - Fiction/Literary
