= Mike Sacks =

American writer and magazine editor

- Sacks in 2023
- Born: Virginia, US
- Education: Tulane University
- Writing career
- Genre: Humor
- Notable works: And Here's The Kicker, Your Wildest Dreams, Within Reason
- Website: mikesacks.com

Mike Sacks is an American author and comedy writer based in New York City. He has contributed to the New Yorker, McSweeney's, Esquire, Salon, Vanity Fair, GQ, Believer, Vice, the New York Times and the Washington Post. Sacks is a New York Times bestselling author. His works have been featured on Vulture’s “Best Comedy Books of the Year” list.

Sacks has written four comedy audio projects, two through Audible, featuring Jon Hamm, Rhea Seehorn, Andy Richter, Paul F. Tompkins, Philip Baker Hall, Bobby Moynihan, John Waters, Adam Scott, Gillian Jacobs, Bob Odenkirk, Laraine Newman, and others.

Sacks has been featured in Vanity Fair, The Washington Post, The New York Times, The New Orleans Picayune, The Onion AV Club, Vulture, McSweeney's, Believer magazine, Cracked, and other publications. He has appeared on BBC, CNN and NPR's Weekend Edition.

In 2017, Sacks created a vanity press imprint dubbed "Sunshine Beam Publishing" which he created "primarily to publish stuff no one else would publish."

In 2026, Mike Sacks ran a primary election campaign for the Democratic Party's nomination for New York's 17th congressional district; in the June 23 primary, he won 1.6% of the vote, while the primary election victor Cait Conley went on to defeat incumbent Congressman Mike Lawler in the November 4 general election.

== Early life ==
Sacks was born in Virginia and raised in Maryland. He attended Winston Churchill High School before attending Tulane University in New Orleans.

== Comedy projects ==
=== The Return of Sno Topp ===
In March 2026 it was announced that Chris Elliott would star in a five-part audio stand-alone comedy series for the Sonar Network, written by Mike Sacks, to premiere in early 2027. The name of the project is "The Return of Sno Topp," and will co-star Rhea Seehorn, Jon Hamm, Lauren Adams, and Bridey Elliott.

=== StanLand ===
In June 2025, a new 5-part audio comedy project by Mike Sacks and SG Wilson premiered at the Tribeca Festival. "StanLand" debuted on the Sonar Network on July 29, 2025, and stars Jon Hamm, John Waters, Bobby Moynihan, Rhea Seehorn, Timm Sharp, Steve Little, Lauren Adams, and others. The story concerns a Maryland man who discovers and then ruins a pristine magical land, much like Narnia.

Stanland was nominated for a Best Fiction Podcast at the 2026 Ambies.

=== This Is How We Love: The Foto-Novel ===
In April 2025, Sacks published This Is How We Love: The Foto-Novel, a tie-in book to the worst movie to have ever won the Best Academy Award. The movie and the story behind it are fiction. Included in the book are Patton Oswalt, Chris Meloni, Michael Ian Black, Jo Firestone, Tim Barnes, Jon Hamm, Paul Reubens, Laraine Newman, Amy Sedaris, Scott Rogowsky, Kerri Kenney-Silver, AD Miles, Laura Krafft, Ted Travelstead, Shonali Bhowmik, Dave Hill, Al Madrigal, Seth Herzog, Kimmy Gatewood, Jen Spyra, Jordan Carlos, Owen Kline, Paul Feig, Amber Tamblyn, David Cross, and Bobby Tisdale.

=== Randy: The Full and Complete Unedited Biography and Memoir of the Amazing Life and Times of Randy S.! ===
Randy is a book purported to be a self-published memoir found by Mike Sacks at a garage sale in Poolesville, Maryland and re-published "as is" in 2018. The book was published on Sacks's own imprint Sunshine Beam Press and it made Vulture's list of the Top 10 Humor Books for the year. In January 2023, Randy was re-published by Archway Editions.

In September 2024, Randy became a five-hour audio comedy series on The Sonar Network, starring actors and comedians Dave Willis, Brett Davis, Mike Mitchell of The Birthday Boys and the Doughboys, Samara Naeymi, Colleen Werthmann, Eric Jason Martin and others.

Vice said that "the year's best memoir is about a man who shot a porno in a Baskin-Robbins." Nathan Rabin wrote that "Randy is a hilariously, unexpectedly poignant and eminently worthy addition to Sacks' sociological/anthropological exploration of the American Jackass and his curious ways. Audacious and inspired." John Colapinto of The New Yorker wrote that: "Randy does more to explain certain unexpected turns in this nation's political fate over the last couple of years than a bazillion think-pieces in the Times, Atlantic, New Yorker, MSNBC."

=== Stinker Lets Loose ===
Stinker Lets Loose, published in 2017, is a novelization to a non-existent trucking and CB movie from 1977. The book, a satire on late 1970s Southern-themed movies such as Smokey and the Bandit, Convoy, Every Which Way But Loose, and Hooper, was designed to look similar to a decades-old used book, with creases on the front cover and stains on the back cover.

Vulture wrote that the premise of Stinker Lets Loose is a faux re-release of "a long-out-of-print novelization from 1977 based on a mysterious, long forgotten trucking movie called Stinker Lets Loose! The book features the movie's 'original' ads, 25 black-and-white movie stills (with captions), and an order form to purchase other novelizations."

Vulture named Stinker Lets Loose as an "incredible feat of humor writing" and one of the funniest books of 2017.

In 2018, Audible Originals released Stinker Lets Loose as a three-hour comedy, starring Jon Hamm as Stinker, Rhea Seehorn, Andy Richter, Paul F. Tompkins, Andy Daly, Philip Baker Hall, and others. It made the Amazon Comedy Audio best-seller list and the NY Times Audio Comedy Bestseller List. The audio also features a live reading of Stinker Lets Loose at the 2018 San Fran Sketch Fest. Performers included Jon Hamm, Kevin Pollack, Steve Agee, Andy Richter, Paul F Tompkins, and Busy Phillips.

The Stinker Lets Loose soundtrack was released on cassette and streaming by Burger Records, featuring musicians from Cat Power, Guided by Voices, Bambi Kino, and Nada Surf.

=== Poking a Dead Frog ===
Poking a Dead Frog was published in June 2014 from Viking/Penguin. It's Sacks's second collection of interviews with comedy writers. Those interviewed for the book include James Downey, Terry Jones, Mike Schur, Todd Levin, Andres du Bouchet, Henry Beard, James L. Brooks, Megan Amram, Peg Lynch, Peter Mehlman, Paul F Tompkins, Adam McKay, Bill Hader, Scott Jacobson, Bruce Jay Friedman, Bruce Vilanch, Kay Cannon, Will Tracy, Gabe Delahaye, Glen Charles, Joel Begleiter, Marc Maron, George Saunders, Dave Hill, Tom Scharpling, Bob Elliott of Bob and Ray, Amy Poehler, Roz Chast, Henry Alford, Patton Oswalt, Daniel Clowes, Daniel Handler, Anthony Jeselnik, Adam Resnick, Paul Feig, Dan Guterman, Alan Spencer, Mike Dicenzo and Mel Brooks.

The book was a NY Times Bestseller and Best of the Year from NPR. Vulture wrote: "a greater look into the craft and business of comedy writing than you can find anywhere else....A comedy nerd bible." RogerEbert.com wrote: "Analysis of why something is funny can be deadly, but to your credit, the interviews are fascinating inside looks at the process of creating comedy, which is much more illuminating."

The book received a grade of an A from The A.V. Club, which described it as "a series of rich, intimate conversations about the ins and outs of turning funny ideas into real-world art". Flavorwire called the book "a fascinating look into the ways stand-up comedians, directors, and even short stories authors write funny... An absolute must."

Publishers Weekly wrote: "[An] excellent book...[Sacks] once again displays his ability to get fascinating and honest interviews from comic luminaries."

The book received a positive review in the Wall Street Journal: "[Mike Sacks'] conversations with humorists poke at some fundamental concepts of comedy without chloroforming any frogs. More revealingly, the book examines what kind of person comes to make a living putting funny words on paper."

=== Your Wildest Dreams, Within Reason ===
In 2010, Sacks published Your Wildest Dreams, Within Reason from Tin House Books, which contains short humor pieces from The New Yorker, Esquire, Time, Vanity Fair, McSweeney's, and other publications. The A.V. Club rated the book as an A−, saying: "The fun in Your Wildest Dreams is watching Sacks unpack his weirdness, and there's plenty of weirdness to unpack." Booklist gave the book a positive review and wrote: "Previously published in such publications as McSweeney's and the New Yorker, these comic pieces should appeal to fans of offbeat humor. Sacks and his various coauthors are gifted humorists, and it's safe to say that any reader will emit chuckles, guffaws, and chortles while perusing nearly every page." NPR declared that "Vanity Fair editor Mike Sacks is a frequent contributor to The New Yorker and McSweeney's, and the comic shorts collected in Your Wildest Dreams are as smart and silly as fans of those magazines might expect." Publishers Weekly wrote that the book is "a selection of contemporary social satires" that is often "hilarious."

=== And Here's the Kicker ===
Sacks's first book of interviews with comedy writers, And Here's the Kicker, was published in 2009 from Writers Digest Books and re-released in 2024 from Open Road Media. The book contains interviews with Stephen Merchant, Harold Ramis, Dan Mazer, Paul Feig, Bob Odenkirk, Todd Hanson, Mitch Hurwitz, David Sedaris, Al Jaffee, Allison Silverman, Robert Smigel, Dave Barry, Larry Wilmore, Jack Handey, Larry Gelbart, Buck Henry, Merrill Markoe, Irving Brecher, Marshall Brickman, George Meyer and Dick Cavett.

The book received a starred review in Publishers Weekly, saying "Sack[s] has compiled a lively compendium sure to captivate anyone who loves a good comedy."

The A.V. Club wrote that these comedy writers are "lucky to have a gifted chronicler like Sacks documenting their curious ways and odd customs for posterity."

Time Magazine wrote that "comedy writers tend to be depressed, brilliant, erratic and sometimes even funny. Mike Sacks' collection of remarkably frank interviews with 21 of them reads like a secret history of popular culture." The book was a Top 10 seller for Amazon's "Comedy Television," "Biographies of Comedians," and "Comedy."

=== Other books ===
- Sacks, Mike; Thyre, Sarah (August 24, 2010). Sex: Our Bodies, Our Junk. Three Rivers Press. ISBN 978-0307592163.
- The Believer (March 6, 2012). Care To Make Love In That Gross Little Space Between Cars?: A Believer Book of Advice. Vintage. ISBN 978-0307743718.
- E.L. Lessert (July 1, 2020). Passable in Pink: A Prom Com. Sunshine Beam Publishing. ISBN 978-0578706290.
- Sacks, Mike (December 8, 2020). Slouchers: The Novelization. Sunshine Beam Publishing. ISBN 978-0578792057.
- Skippy "Batty" Battison (February 22, 2022). Passing On The Right: My Ups, My Downs, My Lefts, My Rights, My Wrongs ... and My Career (So Far) in this Bizarro World of Comedy. Sunshine Beam Publishing. ISBN 978-0578329499.
- Sacks, Mike (March 17, 2022). I Am Super Pumped! Let's Do This Shit!!!!!!!!!!!: The Marketing of "Passing on the Right". Sunshine Beam Publishing. ISBN 978-0578394985.
- Sacks, Mike; Roeder, Jason (April 26, 2022). Welcome to Woodmont College. McSweeney's Publishing. ISBN 978-1952119439.

== Other work ==
Some of Sacks' works were originally, or have been adapted into, audiobooks. The audiobook version of Stinker Lets Loose featured Jon Hamm, Andy Richter and Phillip Baker Hall. Passable in Pink was an audiobook satire of John Hughes' filmography, and featured Gillian Jacobs, Adam Scott and Bobby Moynihan.

At The New Yorker in 2021, Sacks interviewed Simpsons writer John Swartzwelder. This was Swartzwelder's first major interview.

== Critical reception ==
Sacks is popular with some comedians, including David Sedaris and Andy Richter. Critics tend to appreciate his work, while the general public can be left confused.

This is evident in the reception of Sacks' two interview anthologies, Poking a Dead Frog and Here's the Kicker. While some critics saw and appreciated the interviews as a reflection on working in the industry, many readers expected a manual on how to make it as a comedian. Dead Frog was also criticized for a lack of diversity: 7 of 44 interviews were with women.

His early work and works published under his own imprint have received both praise and critique. In August 2025, The Hollywood Reporter wrote that Sacks "never put much stock in trends or traditional definitions of comedy success. On the contrary, he goes out of his way to conceal his involvement in his oddball works, happy to be revered by alt-comedy cognoscenti." The article also mentioned that Sacks has a long list of "celebrity fans and collaborators, including such luminaries as Andy Richter, Bob Odenkirk, Laraine Newman, John Waters, and his two most reliable cast members, Rhea Seehorn and Jon Hamm."
