= The First Collection of Criticism by a Living Female Rock Critic =

Collection of music criticism

- Author: Jessica Hopper
- Language: English
- Subject: Music
- Publisher: Featherproof
- Publication date: May 12, 2015
- Pages: 201
- ISBN: 978-0983186335
- Website: The First Collection of Criticism by a Living Female Rock Critic

The First Collection of Criticism by a Living Female Rock Critic is a 2015 essay collection by music critic Jessica Hopper.

== Development and publication ==
The idea of collecting her columns into a book had been suggested to Hopper some years earlier by Akashic publisher Johnny Temple; the project ultimately came to fruition when her friend, musician Tim Kinsella, became head of Featherproof Books in 2014 and asked Hopper to make a book of her criticism his first project with the publishing house.

Featherproof published the book on May 12, 2015.

== Content ==
The book contains 42 pieces of Hopper's work, organized thematically into eight chapters. They are drawn from reviews, interviews, and essays in a range of publications from mainstream to fanzines.

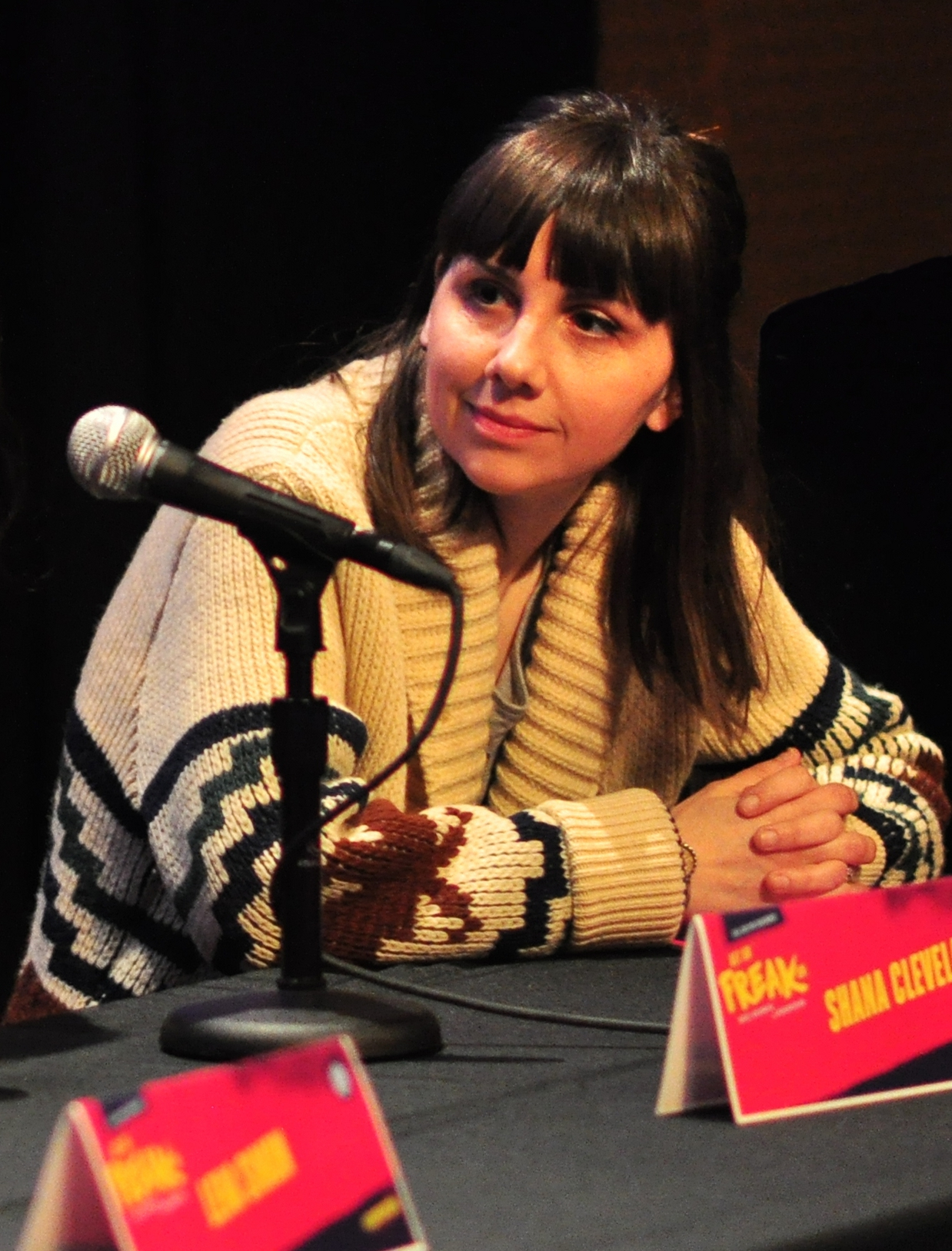
Jessica Hopper in 2015

== Reception ==
The First Collection's popularity prompted three print runs from presales alone.

Reviewing the book in the Chicago Tribune, Kathleen Rooney compared Hopper to critics like Pauline Kael and Susan Sontag, saying "Every piece...is powerfully written, wittily observed and unafraid to argue. Taken individually...and as a whole, they make an airtight case for why the professional critic still matters, and why it is a thrill to spend time in the presence of someone whose job it is to care so much and so intelligently." New York Times book critic Dwight Garner described The First Collection as "by turns loose and warm and finicky and outraged, and its best pieces are more observant than 94 percent of the first novels that have come my way this year."

== 2021 edition ==
In 2021, Hopper released a revised version with additional essays and a foreword by Samantha Irby. A starred review in Publishers Weekly said, “This revised and expanded edition ... hits just as hard.”
