= Jonathan Messinger =

American writer, critic and editor

Jonathan Messinger is a writer, book critic, and the editor of Public Spend Forum, a public sector procurement blog that is part of Spend Matters Group. He is also the writer and producer of the Alien Adventures of Finn Caspian, a children's science fiction podcast. He was formerly Time Out Chicago's books editor and Web editor for Time Out Chicago Kids. Jonathan was born in Boston, Massachusetts and lives in Chicago, Illinois, USA.

He has contributed his fiction writing to the journal McSweeney's, among many other major and alternative publications. While at Clark University he was the editor of the student magazine The Wheatbread. Messinger was also the editor of THISisGRAND, a web magazine chronicling true stories on Chicago's public transit. He has toured extensively in Canada and the United States, and is the creator and host of The Dollar Store Reading Series, a successful monthly show where he hands out items purchased for a dollar to writers and comedians, who then use the item as inspiration for stories.

Messinger's first published collection of short stories, Hiding Out, was released in 2007 through Featherproof books, an independent publisher which he cofounded in 2005 in combination with fellow writer Zach Dodson. The general critical response was positive. Mark Eleveld in Booklist, Donna Seaman in Chicago Tribune and Kevin Sampsell in The Portland Mercury were impressed, whereas a more mixed review was published in Publishers Weekly. He has written four books based on his Alien Adventures of Finn Caspian podcast, which is also being adapted as a TV movie.

Jonathan is on adjunct staff at DePaul University.

== Novels ==
- Hiding Out - Featherproof books 2007
