= HTMLGIANT =

Online literature blog

- Website type: Blog
- Editors: Blake Butler; Lily Hoang
- Launched: 2008

HTMLGIANT is an online literature blog founded by American author Blake Butler. It presents itself as a "literature blog that isn't always about literature", and includes book reviews and interviews. It is considered to be an important outlet for alternative literature, a loosely defined literary movement.

== History ==
The website was founded in 2008 by Gene Morgan and Blake Butler. In 2014, the site shut down due to allegations of sexual misconduct by members of the alt-lit community. Two years after shutting down, the site was brought back online in 2016.

== Contributors ==
Notable contributors include Roxane Gay, Ariana Reines, & Jackie Wang.
