= Bob Contant =

American bookseller

Robert Gregory Contant (March 17, 1943 – November 6, 2023) was an American bookseller. He was one of the founders of St. Mark's Bookshop.
