= Charles theonia =

American writer

charles theonia
- Occupation: Writer
- Writing career
- Language: English
- Genre: Poetry
- Notable work: Gay Heaven Is a Dance Floor but I Can't Relax

charles theonia (stylized in lowercase) is a Brooklyn based poet whose work has been featured in such outlets as Social Text, Poetry Project, Texas Review, Black Warrior Review, and The Brooklyn Rail.

== Work ==
theonia is best known for the poetry collection Gay Heaven Is a Dance Floor but I Can't Relax, published by Archway Editions in 2024, a long-form work dedicated to Arthur Russell with cover art from Joe Brainard. The book was covered in The Brooklyn Rail, BOMB, and Poetry Project, among others.

== Bibliography ==
=== Poetry ===
- Gay Heaven Is a Dance Floor but I Can't Relax (2024). Archway Editions ISBN 978-1648230523
