= St. Mark's Bookshop =

Former bookstore in Manhattan, New York

Coordinates: 40.72379°N 73.98585°W

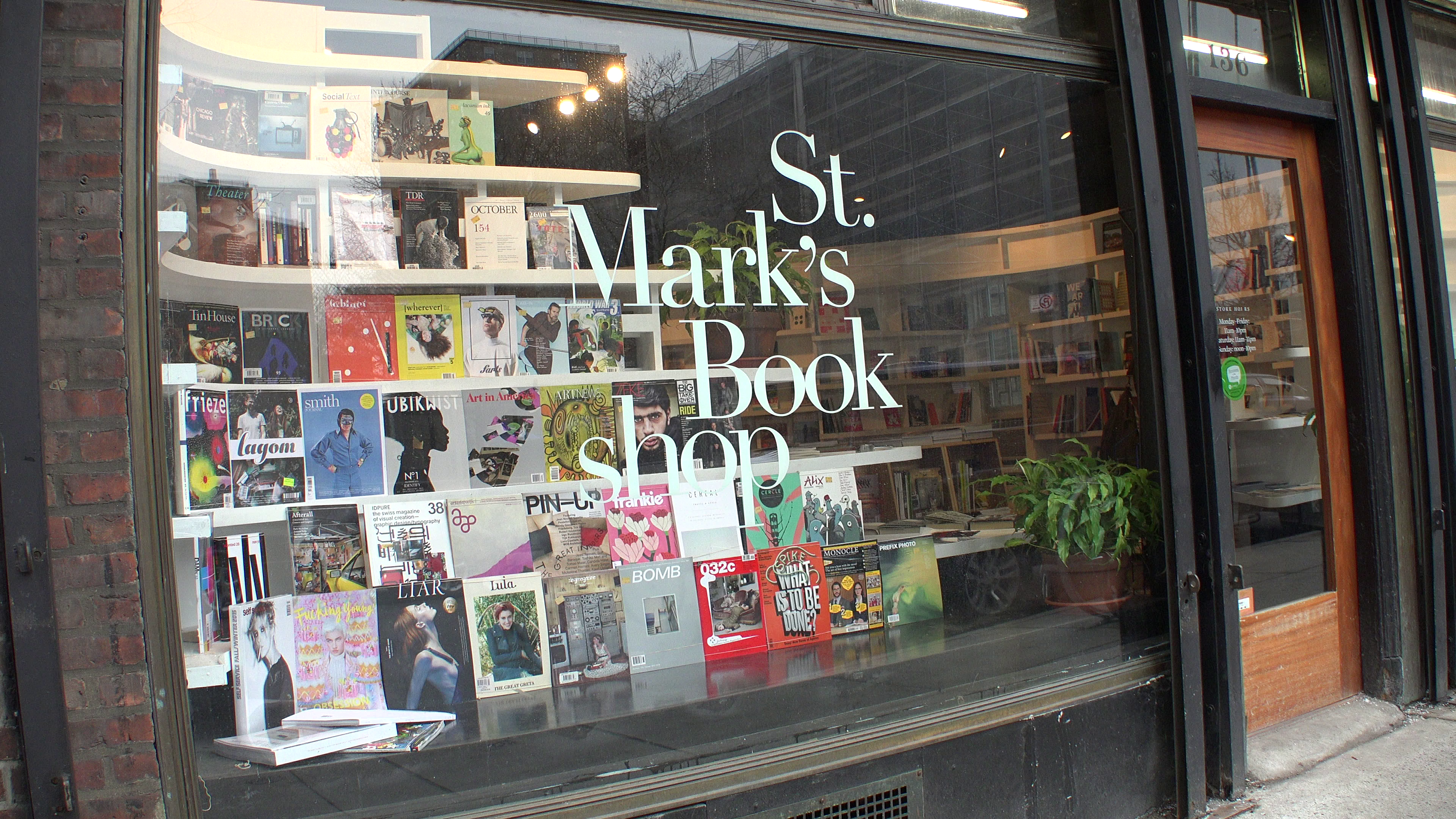
The front window of St Marks Bookshop, in New York City

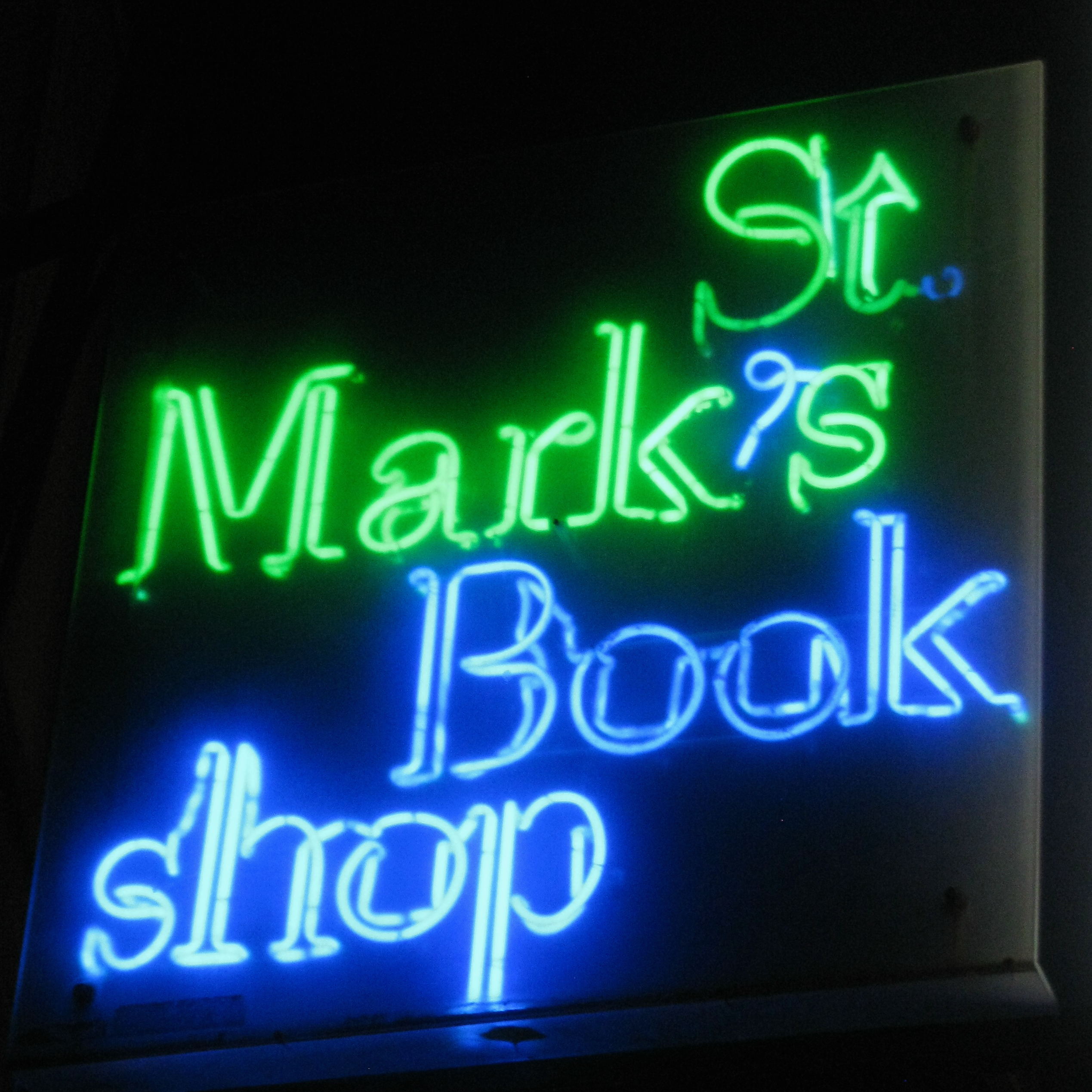
Its neon sign

St. Mark's Bookshop was an independent book store, established in 1977 in New York City's East Village neighborhood. It was the oldest independent bookstore in Manhattan owned by its original owners. The shop, run by proprietors Bob Contant and Terry McCoy, specialized in cultural and critical theory, graphic design, poetry, small presses, and film studies—what the New York Times called "neighborhood-appropriate literature". It featured a curated selection of fiction, periodicals and journals, including foreign titles, and included unusual-for-bookstores sections on belles-lettres, anarchists, art criticism, women's studies, music, drama, and drugs.

The store, named after St. Mark's Place, its original location, closed on February 28, 2016, due to rising rent and mismanagement.

== Description ==
The Third Avenue location featured small press poetry books, among others, in the front and had a table with expensive art books and an information desk in the back. There was also an "X case," a section of selections next to the information desk where the books that were stolen the most were kept, works by Charles Bukowski and William Burroughs, and, at one point, a consignment section.

== History ==
Its first location was at 13 St. Marks Place. Originally the store was on the first floor, up two steps from the street. Around 1982 the store added two the basement level where most of the sections related to social history were housed. Also around the time the basement opened the store created a section named "Structuralism and Since" which was one of the first collections of what has become. more generally known as "critical theory". In 1987, it moved across the street to 12 St. Marks Place, built originally as the home of the Deutsch-Amerikanische Schuetzen Gesellschaft, or German American Shooting Society. The owners were wooed away from this location to below a Cooper Union dormitory on Third Avenue and Stuyvesant Street by the then-vice president of Cooper Union for lower rent. (The point of the lure was the development of the Green Building on the east side of Third Avenue between Sixth and Seventh Streets.)

It made a great deal of money in the 1990s and 2000s, especially on weekends. Former employee Margarita Shalina wrote in 2016 that at this time, "it was flush with money." Some of this was due to the popularity of its expensive art books. Jacques Derrida was known to have visited, as well as Daniel Craig and a drunk Susan Sontag. Other visitors included Madonna and Philip Glass, and when the store started to accommodate speakers, Slavoj Zizek and Michael Moore.

=== Financial problems ===
At one point, the store manager retired and his replacement focused on book returns and reordering titles from wholesalers. Shalina describes "books were cycling through the store without being given a chance to sell, sometimes at as little as four weeks. The scale on which we were doing this was ridiculous and no one seemed to take freight into consideration." She also described how ordering became "for the most part, unregulated and unbudgeted." Records were not kept, and "the manager would habitually delete the sales history of books."

In 2011, St. Mark's Bookshop's financial problems became evident, exacerbated by the high rent. An online petition, started by a patron of the establishment, asking that the store's landlord, Cooper Union, reduce the rent, garnered over 40,000 signatures. In August 2012, over $24,000 was raised in an online funding drive. Cooper Union, in the meantime, had been beset by financial woes of its own: Historically tuition-free, the administrators started charging tuition in the fall of 2014 to try to make up for lost endowment income.

In May 2014, the store announced plans to move from 31 Third Avenue to a smaller space at 126 E. Third St; their new landlord was the New York City Housing Authority. Though Clouds Architectural Office was commissioned to design its new space, declining sales over the years made the store unable to afford the rent at the new location. An auction was held to raise funds to cover moving expenses.

== Competitive pressure ==
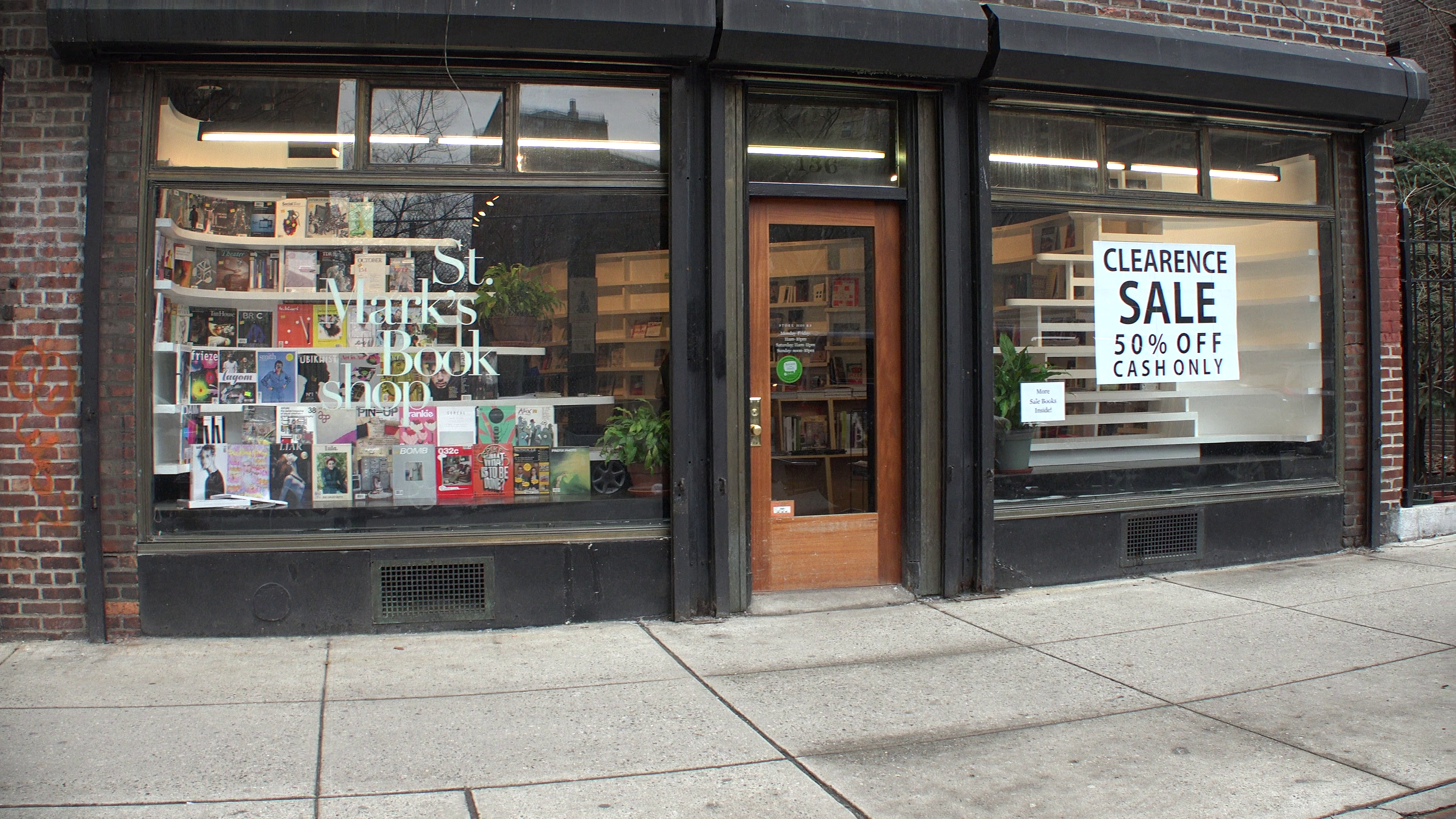
St Marks Bookshop during its clearance sale

Independent bookstores have a long history in New York. Other examples include The Strand, Westsider, McNally Jackson, Shakespeare & Co, WORD, Longitude, Bluestockings, and Housing Works and in Brooklyn, powerHouse, BookCourt, and Greenlight Bookstore. These stores and small chains have been feeling competitive pressure from the larger chains, internet-based booksellers, and digital media. In an attempt to be competitive with electronic media, St. Mark's and OR Books engaged in a joint venture where OR Books sold their electronic media via the St. Mark's website.

Even some of the larger chains, such as Borders, have been unable to remain solvent in the face of competitive pressures from web-based stores and e-books.

== Former employees ==
Past employees of St. Mark's Bookshop include playwright Annie Baker, artist Wade Guyton, poet Ron Kolm, philosopher Andrea Hiott writer-performer Julie Klausner, and writer-translator Margarita Shalina. Susan Willmarth and Siobhan Kattago. Previous to founding St. Mark's Bookshop, owners Bob Contant and Terry McCoy both worked at 8th Street Books and also at East Side Books.

== Awards ==
- 2014 design award from the American Institute of Architects

== See also ==
- Books in the United States
- List of independent bookstores in the United States
