= Olivia Kan-Sperling =

American writer

- Occupations: Writer, editor
- Writing career
- Language: English
- Genres: Fiction, criticism
- Notable work: Little Pink Book

Olivia Kan-Sperling is a novelist, editor, and critic from Massachusetts. She has written for outlets such as N+1, Spike Art Magazine, Artforum, ArtReview, and Flash Art.

== Work ==
Formerly at Farrar, Straus & Giroux's MCD imprint, Kan-Sperling is a longtime contributor to and associate editor for The Paris Review. She is best known for the novel Little Pink Book, published by Archway Editions in 2025, which featured in Interview, BOMB, and Los Angeles Review of Books, among others. Kan-Sperling is half-Chinese, and identifies as wasian.

== Bibliography ==
=== Fiction ===
- Little Pink Book (2025). Archway Editions ISBN 978-1648230417
- Island Time (2022). Expat Press ISBN 979-8985729795
