= The Haunting of Lin-Manuel Miranda =

2019 play by Ishmael Reed

- Original language: English
- Written by: Ishmael Reed
- Subject: Hamilton, Lin-Manuel Miranda
- Genre: Satire, drama
- Setting: Present day

Premiere
- Date: May 23, 2019
- Place: Nuyorican Poets Cafe, Manhattan

The Haunting of Lin-Manuel Miranda is a satire play by American writer Ishmael Reed. It critiques the acclaimed historical musical Hamilton through a depiction of a fictionalized version of Hamilton's creator Lin-Manuel Miranda, who is visited by several historical figures missing from the musical in a style similar to Charles Dickens' 1843 novella A Christmas Carol. The play echoes critiques made by historians of the whitewashing of Alexander Hamilton.

Reed debuted the play in January 2019 with a four-night reading at the Nuyorican Poets Cafe, and the play was fully staged in May 2019 and ran for several weeks in the same location. The Haunting received mixed reviews from critics.

== Background and development ==
Reed wrote a critique of the musical Hamilton shortly after its debut for the August 2015 edition of the magazine CounterPunch, titled "Hamilton: the Musical: Black Actors Dress Up like Slave Traders... and It's Not Halloween". In it he accused Lin-Manuel Miranda of whitewashing Alexander Hamilton's role as a slave owner and his involvement in the genocide of Native Americans. Reed followed this with a second critique for the magazine in April 2016, titled "Hamilton and the Negro Whisperers: Miranda's Consumer Fraud". Reed likened the casting of a Black actor in the role of George Washington to a scenario where Jewish actors would portray Nazi officials Joseph Goebbels, Adolf Eichmann, and Adolf Hitler.

The Haunting expands on Reed's critiques of Hamilton, which include "turning a blind eye to the Schuyler family's ownership of slaves and soft-pedaling Alexander Hamilton's elitist politics and his attitude toward slavery." Reed stated that his goal for writing The Haunting was for it to "be a counter-narrative to the text that has been distributed to thousands of students throughout the country." Journalist Emil Guillermo observed: "So people dance and rhyme to a hip hop beat, does that forgive Hamilton's family, kneed-deep in slavery as slave holders in upstate New York? The musical glorifies Hamilton and his connections. [...] Sure, putting blacks and people of color is a great diversity trick. But the truth still has to count for something."

== Reviews ==
Reviewers noted that Reed's perspectives are shared by many historians who levied critiques about the historical accuracy of Hamilton after its release. Critics also noted that The Haunting fits with the rest of Reed's career of questioning white supremacy in cultural institutions, such as in his 1972 novel Mumbo Jumbo; Nawal Arjini wrote in The Nation that "[b]oth works attempt, with varying degrees of success, to reimagine the history taught in school as one in which people of color have power." Lauren Kane wrote in The Paris Review that "Reed's play is aware of how sticky historical moralizing can be, taking aim even at itself as the spirits bicker about land rights, and while the script is smart in presenting how the project of correcting one another's perspective on history can divide when it should unite, it doesn't pull punches or mince words."

== Plot summary ==
After taking Ambien given to him by his agent, Hamilton creator Lin-Manuel Miranda is visited by the spirits of George Washington and Alexander Hamilton, as well as those left out of his musical, including enslaved Africans, Native Americans, a white indentured servant, and Harriet Tubman. In a dream, Washington and Hamilton reveal their contempt for Africans and Native Americans. After Miranda wakes up, the other spirits try to inform Miranda about their lives, while he appears confused. Miranda continuously defers to Ron Chernow's 2004 biography Alexander Hamilton to justify the content of the musical. After Miranda becomes convinced by the spirits' accounts of their lives and the consequences of the actions of Washington and Hamilton, he goes to confront Chernow, who is unapologetic. At the conclusion, Miranda's agent tells him he has been commissioned to write a play about Christopher Columbus. Throughout, the play also critiques Hamilton's high ticket prices and "corny" songs.

== Cast ==
- Jesse Bueno as Lin-Manuel Miranda
- Robert Turner as the spirit of George Washington
- Erika Pizarro as Venus, the spirit of a person enslaved by George Washington's sister-in-law Hannah Washington, whose son, West Ford, is believed to have been fathered by George Washington
- Zachary Clarence as the spirit of Alexander Hamilton
- N. Allam Forster as Miranda's agent
- Tommie J. Moore as Ben, the spirit of a person enslaved by the Schuyler family
- Pepsi Robinson as the spirit of a Native American man living at the time of Washington and Hamilton
- Vanessa Lovestone as the spirit of a Native American woman living at the time of Washington and Hamilton
- Malika Iman as Negro Woman, the spirit of a historical figure known as "Negro woman with child" according to Hamilton's expense accounts who, with her child, was sold by Hamilton
- Roz Fox as the spirit of Harriet Tubman
- Lisa Pakulski as the spirit of a female indentured servant who worked for the Schuyler family at their mansion in Albany, New York
- Monisha Shiva as the spirit of Diana, an enslaved person owned and sold by the Schuyler family who is known to have died running away from her second master
- Tom Angelo as Ron Chernow

== Productions ==
Reed hosted a debut reading of the two-act play at Nuyorican Poets Café in January 2019. Reed stated at the initial reading that the play is meant to critique Miranda for his "shoddy research" rather than portray him as a villain. It ran for four nights and simultaneously served as a fundraiser for a full-length production. It sold out each night. The fundraiser was successful, and Reed stated in an interview that Toni Morrison made the second-largest contribution to the campaign, with Robert Mailer Anderson playing the role of Ron Chernow for the first four staged readings in January 2019.

The Haunting of Lin-Manuel Miranda premiered a full staging at the Nuyorican Poets Café on May 23, 2019, and ran through June 16, 2019. It ran a second time, from October 4 to October 27, 2019, in the same location.

The play was directed by Rome Neal. Similar to Hamilton, several of the characters are played by actors of different races, such as Robert Turner, a black actor who portrays George Washington.

== Critical reception ==
In a New Yorker profile, Julian Lucas observed: "News that someone hated [Hamilton] enough to stage a play about it caused a minor sensation. For those familiar with Reed's work, the drama was even more irresistible: a founding father of American multiculturalism was calling bullshit on its Broadway apotheosis."

The play received mixed critical reception. Critics spoke positively of the acting, the wittiness of the script, and the "catharsis" of Miranda's character being dressed down in the play. Nawal Arjini of The Nation commented positively on the quality of the acting, stating: "Turning what are essentially history lectures into riveting theater is a tall order for most actors, but the cast is for the most part up to the challenge." Critics also noted that the play ends by painting Miranda's fictionalized character with a sympathetic brush as someone who has been taken advantage of by institutional powers, a notion Reed supported in an interview for Current Affairs.

Negative criticisms of the play described it as overly didactic. In a review for The New York Times, Elizabeth Vincentelli stated: "The Haunting is classic activist theater—the haphazard acting is typical of the genre—that prefers didacticism to dialectic. Miranda merely submits to a series of impassioned monologues, a format that saps the show of the energy that would have been generated by back-and-forth exchange." The play was mocked by Peter Sagal of Wait Wait... Don't Tell Me!, who expressed disbelief that anyone could dislike "the most beloved musical of modern times."

The reading was also described as low-energy and boring by Jeremy Gordon of The Outline, who said "even though the reading couldn't be judged as a completed play—only a few of the actors were in costume, and there was no set nor action—it was hard to imagine how Miranda getting educated in long, unbroken chunks of dialogue could be staged in an interesting way." Similarly, Hua Hsu of The New Yorker wrote, "Some of the history lessons were long-winded and meandering—and maybe slightly confusing without a basic grasp of the original musical... The Haunting of Lin-Manuel Miranda is a minor entry in an important and sometimes overwhelming body of work."

After the reading, Twitter users questioned the validity of the play after critics noted that Reed had not seen Hamilton. In an interview, Reed stated that he had "extensively studied" the script before writing The Haunting. By the time the full production premiered, Reed inserted a joke in the script about missing a mortgage payment to see the national tour of the show in San Francisco.

== Book ==
The Haunting of Lin-Manuel Miranda was published in book form by Archway Editions (distributed by Simon & Schuster) on October 20, 2020.
