= Molly Brodak =

American poet, writer, and baker (1980–2020)

- Born: March 29, 1980
- Died: March 8, 2020 (aged 39)
- Occupations: Poet; writer; baker
- Spouse: Blake Butler (m. 2017)

Molly Brodak (March 29, 1980 – March 8, 2020) was an American poet, writer, and baker. She was the author of the poetry collection A Little Middle of the Night (University of Iowa Press, 2010) and the memoir Bandit (Grove Press, 2016). The Atlanta Journal-Constitution described Bandit as: "a book about stories and character, of how events and actions shape who we are, how a father becomes one person, how a daughter grows up to be another." The New York Times called Bandit "a good book, and with good reason," while Kirkus called it: "an intelligent, disturbing, and profoundly honest memoir."

== Career ==
In a feature on NPR's All Things Considered, Brodak described the ethical process of Bandit's subject, which detailed her experience as the daughter of Joseph Brodak, a multiple felon bankrobber in Detroit, Michigan: "Every family has darkness and heaviness that people would prefer to not talk about. And when you choose to become the person who's going to bring light to the dark family secrets, you can sometimes be perceived as the betrayer." An excerpt from Bandit appeared in Best American Nonrequired Reading 2016. In 2018, she was a recipient of an NEA fellowship for prose.

Brodak's poems appeared widely, including in Granta, Poetry, Fence, Map Literary, NY Tyrant, Diode Poetry Journal, New Orleans Review, Ninth Letter, Colorado Review, Bateau, and Hayden's Ferry Review. Her poem Jesus inspired the song I WHO BEND THE TALL GRASSES by Lingua Ignota.

Her collection, The Cipher, won the 2019 Pleiades Press Editors Prize, and was published in 2020.

Brodak was also the founder of Kookie House, a baking blog about unique cookies and cakes. In 2017, she appeared as a finalist on the Great American Baking Show.

== Death ==
Brodak died on March 8, 2020. According to The New York Times, her husband, Blake Butler, gave the cause of death as suicide by gunshot. She had struggled with depression since childhood.

In 2023, Butler published a memoir, called Molly, detailing his relationship with Brodak up until her death.
