= David Velasco =

American editor (born 1978)

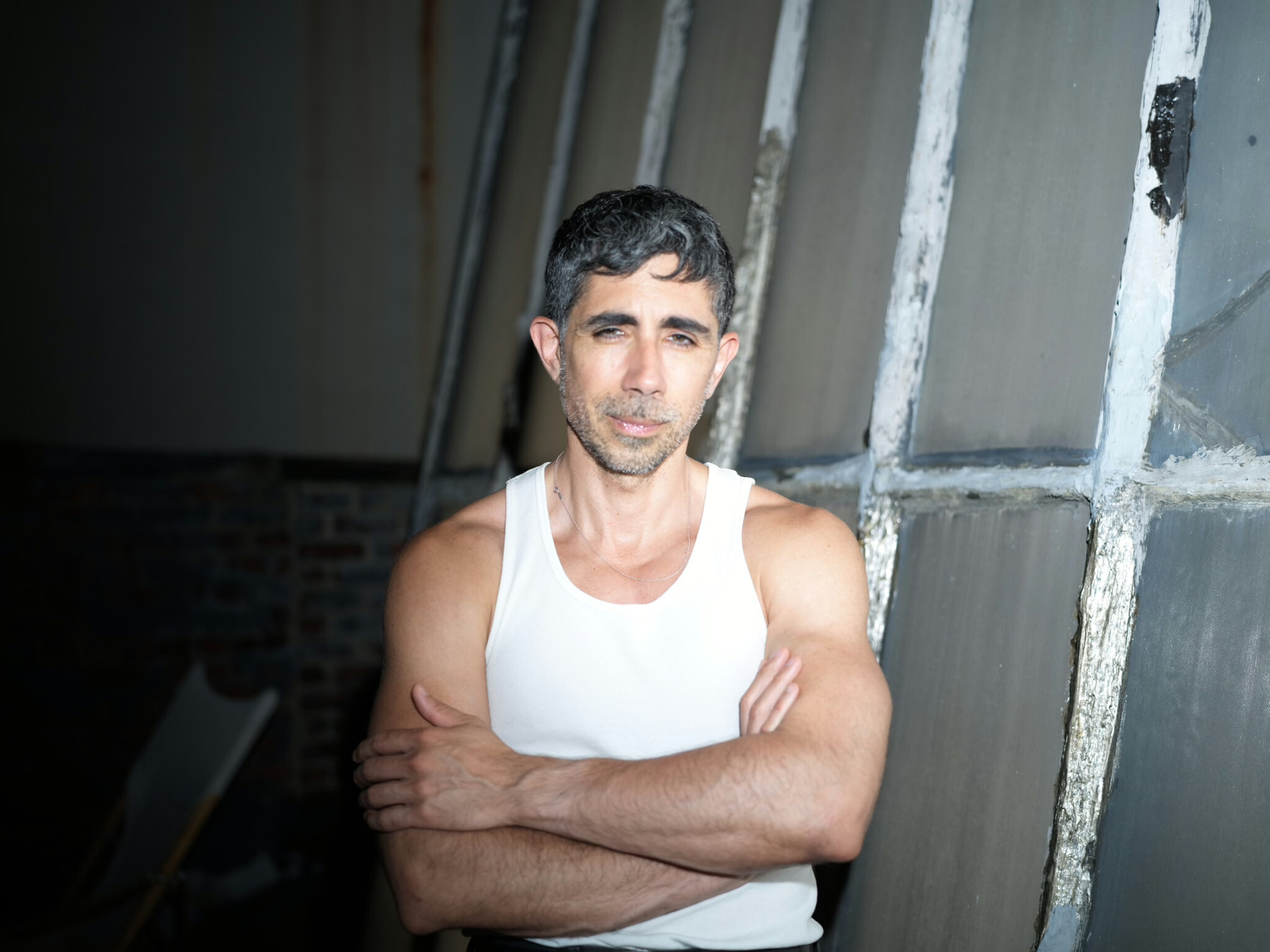
- Born: October 23, 1978 (age 48); United States
- Education: Reed College, New York University
- Occupations: Editor, writer
- Employer: Artforum (2005–2023)
- Known for: Writing, Contemporary Art
- Spouse: Ryan McNamara (married)

David Velasco (born October 23, 1978) is an American writer and editor. He was the editor-in-chief of the art magazine Artforum from 2017 to 2023. He is the editor of Modern Dance, a 2017 series of books on contemporary choreographers published by the Museum of Modern Art, New York. He has written texts on a number of artists, including Sarah Michelson, Adrian Piper, and David Wojnarowicz. In 2017, he helped photographer and activist Nan Goldin establish the activist group P.A.I.N., chronicled in Laura Poitras's Academy Award–nominated documentary All the Beauty and the Bloodshed (2022).

== Early life ==
In 2000, Velasco earned a bachelor's degree in anthropology from Reed College. In 2004, he earned a master's degree from New York University in social theory and humanities.

Velasco was raised by his mother, grandmother, and great-grandmother in Portland, Oregon. In a 2025 article in Harper's detailing the murder of his friend Brent Sikkema, he describes growing up "poor in Oregon, a Mexican bastard born to a sixteen-year-old white high-school dropout."

== Career ==
In 2005, Velasco joined Artforum as an editorial assistant at the website. He became the site editor in 2008, and frequently wrote features on artists, artworks, and events. He initiated a series of books on modern dance published by the Museum of Modern Art in 2016.

In November 2017, he became the editor-in-chief of Artforum, succeeding Michelle Kuo, who resigned shortly before the resignation of one of the magazine's publishers, Knight Landesman, following allegations of sexual misconduct. Velasco's leadership was considered a pivot toward a more engaged progressive politics, with art critic Jerry Saltz writing in New York magazine that "Velasco might be the perfect person in the perfect place at the perfect time." In his first issue, featuring a self-portrait by artist Kia LaBeija on the cover, Velasco wrote that, "[t]he art world is misogynist. Art history is misogynist. Also racist, classist, transphobic, ableist, homophobic. I will not accept this. Intersectional feminism is an ethics near and dear to so many on our staff. Our writers too. This is where we stand. There's so much to be done. Now, we get to work."

The issue also featured artist Nan Goldin's essay and portfolio recounting her addiction to the prescription pain-relief drug OxyContin, which became the founding action of P.A.I.N., an organization dedicated to exposing the role of Purdue Pharma and the Sackler family in the opioid epidemic. The campaign coincided with Christopher Glazek's report in Esquire and, several weeks later, Patrick Radden Keefe's report in The New Yorker on the Sacklers' "criminal misbranding." Both journalists reported that Purdue Pharma led doctors to believe Oxycontin was less addictive than had been reported. Goldin demanded in her essay that the Sacklers donate half of their fortune to drug rehabilitation clinics and programs. Thessaly La Force of the New York Times Style Magazine wrote that "[i]t is rare these days to see a lone artist like Goldin—especially one both critically and commercially successful, whose work is in dozens of important museum collections, including the Metropolitan Museum of Art and the Museum of Modern Art—step into the ring as an activist."

In July 2019, Velasco commissioned "The Tear Gas Biennial," an essay by Hannah Black, Ciarán Finlayson, and Tobi Haslett targeting Warren Kanders, co-chair of the board of the Whitney Museum, and his "toxic philanthropy." Kanders was the CEO of Safariland LLC, a company that manufactures riot gear, tear gas, and other chemical weapons. Four artists participating in the Whitney Biennial at that time—Korakrit Arunanondchai, Meriem Bennani, Nicole Eisenman, and Nicholas Galanin—wrote a letter demanding immediate removal of their work. Days later, Kanders stepped down from his leadership position at the museum. "In the pantheon of texts about art," Artnet's Ben Davis wrote, "there are very, very few that have had the impact of 'The Tear Gas Biennial.'"

On October 26, 2023, Velasco was fired by Penske Media Corporation after the publication reprinted an open letter, which received 8,000 signatories, calling for a ceasefire in Gaza during the Gaza war. The letter was published on October 19, and initially failed to report the October 7 attack by Hamas that killed 1,400 Israelis and the taking of around 200 people as hostages. The letter originally circulated as a Google document, and also appeared in e-flux and Hyperallergic. Prominent collectors including Martin Eisenberg and Eleanor Cayre contacted artists to demand they retract their signatures, and several did so. Magazine publishers Danielle McConnell and Kate Koza stated that he violated the "standard editorial process" of the magazine with the letter, following a campaign of art collectors and advertisers who objected to the letter, though Velasco has disputed this account in subsequent interviews and argued that "[t]he sudden invention of phantom procedures is one of the more despicable attempts to disguise my firing as a matter of protocol rather than politics."

Velasco told The New York Times that he had "no regrets," and that he was disappointed that Artforum "bent to outside pressure." A number of musicians, writers, philosophers, and artists, including Laura Poitras, Brian Eno, Barbara Kruger, Judith Butler, Saidiya Hartman, Nicole Eisenman, and Nan Goldin, signed the letter and several publicly called for a boycott of Artforum in response to Velasco being fired. Poitras wrote to Penske stating that Velasco had “elevated the magazine and institution intellectually, politically, and artistically," and, “[a]s a journalist, it is important for me to stress this is not only about Artforum—this is about free speech, editorial independence, and press freedom.” Zack Hatfield, a senior editor for Artforum, announced he was leaving following the firing of Velasco, which he called "unacceptable," as did editors Chloe Wyma, Kate Sutton, and several others. Writers Against the War on Gaza formed the same day as an ad hoc organization, and signed more than 700 writers, artists and cultural workers to a boycott of Penske Media Corporation's three art publications: Artforum, Art in America, and ARTnews. According to a conversation between Velasco and the writer Sarah Schulman in April 2025, the boycott is ongoing.

In 2024, Velasco received a Cultural Freedom Award from the Lannan Foundation; prior recipients include Angela Y. Davis, Ruth Wilson Gilmore, Mike Davis, and Mohammed El Kurd.

In September 2026, Velasco was arrested alongside more than 100 protestors at a protest ahead of a speech by Israeli prime minister Benjamin Netanyahu at the United Nations General Assembly.

Velasco is on the board of directors of the Poetry Project in New York.

== Personal life ==
In a 2018 interview with SSENSE, Velasco stated that he was a vegetarian, relaying a story when he was disappointed there was not "a vegetarian option" and added that he was "shocked because I assumed that most people in the art world would be vegetarians."

In a 2019 profile in Columbia Journalism Review, Kyle Chayka writes that Velasco lives in a rent-stabilized apartment in South Williamsburg with two boyfriends and an adopted pit bull named Sister. In an oral history interview, in June 2020, Velasco noted that he was married to artist Ryan McNamara. In 2024, he said that he was dating poet and Changes Press founder Bennet Bergman.
