= Philip Leider =

American founder and editor of Artforum (1929–2026)

Philip Leider (1929 – January 11, 2026) was an American editor and educator who was the founding editor in chief of Artforum.

Born in New York City in 1929, he earned a BA in history from Brooklyn College and an MA in English Literature from the University of Nebraska.

He began his tenure at Artforum in 1962. Under his direction it became a highly influential periodical in the field. He resigned as editor in 1971, and subsequently taught art history at the University of California, Irvine. In 1989, he became a professor at the Bezalel Academy of Arts and Design. He retired in 1998. He and his wife returned to Berkeley, where he died on January 11, 2026, at the age of 96.

His papers are held in the Smithsonian Institution Archives of American Art.
