= Lindsey Webb =

American poet and academic

- Citizenship: United States
- Education: B.A. (2014); MFA (2017); PhD (2025)
- Alma mater: Brigham Young University, University of Massachusetts Amherst, and University of Utah
- Occupations: Poet, Instructor
- Writing career
- Genre: Poetry
- Notable works: Plat (2024); House (2020)
- Notable awards: The 2020 Ghost Proposal Chapbook Contest
- Website: lindseydwebb1.wordpress.com

Lindsey Webb is a poet and visiting assistant professor at Grinnell College. She has authored a poetry collection Plat, which was named a best poetry book of 2024 by The New York Times Book Review, and two chapbooks.

== Education ==
Webb's research looks at experimental poetics, the history of technology, and the science and poetics of olfaction. She has a B.A. from Brigham Young University (2014), and an MFA from the University of Massachusetts Amherst (2017). In 2025, she earned a PhD in literature and creative writing from the University of Utah, where she was a Clarence Snow Memorial Fellow.

== Career ==
During her MFA, Webb served on the masthead of elsewhere magazine, and is now an editor for Thirdhand Books. Following her PhD in 2025, she now teaches Creative Writing at Grinnell College.

She has published work in such journals as Chicago Review, LitHub, and Denver Quarterly, and is the author of two poetry chapbooks and a full-length collection, Plat (Archway Editions, 2024). House, her debut chapbook from 2020, was the winner of the year's Ghost Proposal Chapbook Contest. It is also one of the three parts of Plat. The work in House was praised for wrapping "itself around both lyric and philosophy". Her second chapbook, Perfumer's Organ, was published in 2023.

In 2023, she also collaborated with Wendy Wischer and John Lin on In Search of Blue Sky, a temporary public artwork "communicat[ing air quality] data to the general community by telling simple, and provocative statements about air and atmosphere".

Plat, Webb's debut collection edited by Naomi Falk for Archway Editions in 2024, has been praised for its "muscular, charismatic" prose. The publication of Plat was complimented by the release of a tie-in perfume.

== Praise ==
In a 2021 interview, writer and artist Nick Maione praised Webb for "embody[ing]" her poems.

Webb's debut Plat was named one of the best poetry books of 2024 by The New York Times, and a notable read at the 2025 Utah Book Awards for Poetry. It was also named among the 2024 AML Award Finalists, and praised for "explor[ing] a vexed, disorienting space." In an interview, Webb called Plat "a house, haunted by the death of a close friend, trying to break the laws of physics in order to see her again", and Bear Reviews called the book an attempt to "make [Webb's] friend's death fit with the conception of heaven she's been taught." Writing for NYT, Elisa Gabbert praised it for "fascinating spatial sensibility" and Webb's architectural thinking, and likened her work to the early writing of the poet Jorie Graham. Writing for the Los Angeles Review of Books, Katherine Gibbel noted Plat for its "uncommon" and "unwavering faith". Rob McLennan praised Webb for the "extremely difficult" task of composing "a volume around grief without falling permanently into the subject matter".

== Books ==
=== Full-length collection ===
- Plat (Archway Editions, 2024) ISBN 9781648230622

=== Pamphlets ===
- House (Ghost Proposal, 2020)
- Perfumer's Organ (above/ground press, 2023) ISBN 9781774602676

== Awards ==
- 2020: Finalist, Charles B. Wheeler Poetry Prize, for Plat
- 2020: Ghost Proposal Chapbook Contest, for House
- 2025: Utah Book Awards Notable Read for Poetry, Plat
- 2025: Association for Mormon Letters Award for Poetry
