= Featherproof Books =

American publishing company

- Founded: 2005
- Founders: Jonathan Messinger and Zach Dodson
- Country of origin: United States
- Headquarters location: Chicago, Illinois
- Distribution: Publishers Group West
- Publication types: Books
- Official website: www.featherproof.com

Featherproof Books is a small, independent publisher based in Chicago, Illinois. It was founded in 2005 by Jonathan Messinger and Zach Dodson. They publish perfect bound novels, short story collections and other works, and offer "mini-books" of short stories and novellas for free download. The publisher employs "a dose of humor" in their work, the founders stating that they are "dedicated to the small-press ideals of finding fresh, urban voices ignored by the conglomerates."

Featherproof Books started in March, 2005 using funds raised from the sale of Zach Dodson's car. Featherproof's first title was The Enchanters vs. Sprawlburg Springs by Brian Costello, released in December, 2005, with the second, Sons of the Rapture by Todd Dills having been released in 2006.

== Books ==
Publications have included:

- The Enchanters vs. Sprawlburg Springs by Brian Costello (ISBN 978-0-9771992-0-4)
- Degrees of Separation edited by Samia Saleem (ISBN 978-0-9771992-2-8)
- Hiding Out by Jonathan Messinger (ISBN 978-0-9771992-3-5)
- This Will Go Down on Your Permanent Record by Susannah Felts (ISBN 978-0-9771992-4-2)
- boring boring boring boring boring boring boring by Zach Plague (ISBN 978-0-9771992-5-9)
- AM/PM by Amelia Gray (ISBN 978-0-9771992-7-3)
- The Karaoke Singer's Guide to Self-Defense by Tim Kinsella (ISBN 978-0-9831863-0-4)
- Sons of the Rapture by Todd Dills (ISBN 978-0-9771992-1-1)
- The Universe in Miniature in Miniature by Patrick Somerville (ISBN 978-0-9825808-1-3)
- Daddy's by Lindsay Hunter (ISBN 978-0-9825808-0-6)
- Scorch Atlas by Blake Butler (ISBN 978-0-9771992-8-0)
- The Awful Possibilities by Christian TeBordo (ISBN 978-0-9771992-9-7)
- The First Collection of Criticism by a Living Female Rock Critic by Jessica Hopper (ISBN 978-0983186335)
- Failure to Comply by Cavar (ISBN 978-1943888290)

== Mini-books ==
Mini-books are a series of self-contained short stories and novellas published periodically. These stories are available online, to be downloaded, printed by the reader, and folded into pocket-sized books. The small size makes them suitable for commuters, and the editors aimed to combine both the "free and easy distribution" provided by the internet with their "love of paper" and the physicality of books.

The free mini-books allow the publisher to work with authors outside of those they publish traditionally. Featured stories have "navigated such diverse topics as failed love, competitive familial golf games and vampires in graveyards".

== Contributors ==
Contributors have included: Ambrose Austin, Kate Axelrod, Kyle Beachy, Blake Butler, Tobias Carroll, Pete Coco, Brian Costello, Elizabeth Crane, Mary Cross, Paul Fatturoso, Jeb Gleason-Allured, Abby Glogower, Laura Bramon Good, Amelia Gray, Mary Hamilton, Andrea Johnson, Rana Kelly, Heidi Laus, Ryan Markel, Jonathan Messinger, Anne Elizabeth Moore, Kerri Mullen, Susan Petrone, Jay Ponteri, Samia Saleem, Kevin Sampsell, Fred Sasaki, Timothy Schaffert, Patrick Somerville, Zach Stage, and Scott Stealey.
