= Blake Butler (author) =

American writer & editor (born 1979)

- Born: 1979 (age 46–47)
- Education: Georgia Tech; Bennington College (MFA)
- Occupations: Writer; editor
- Spouse: Molly Brodak (m. 2017; died 2020) Megan Boyle (m. 2022)
- Website: blakebutler.org

Blake Butler (born 1979) is an American writer and editor. He edited the literature blog HTMLGIANT and several journals, including Lamination Colony, and, with co-editor Ken Baumann, No Colony. His writing has appeared in The New York Times, Harper's, The Paris Review, Birkensnake, The Believer, Unsaid, Fence, Willow Springs, The Lifted Brow, Opium Magazine, Gigantic, and Black Warrior Review. He also wrote a regular column for Vice magazine.

Butler attended Georgia Tech, where he majored in Science, Technology, and Culture. He earned a Master of Fine Arts from Bennington College. He was married to poet and memoirist Molly Brodak from 2017 until her death in 2020. Since 2022 he has been married to writer Megan Boyle.

== Commentary on his work ==
Publishers Weekly has called Butler "an endlessly surprising, funny, and subversive writer". Of There Is No Year, Library Journal wrote, "This artfully crafted, stunning piece of nontraditional literature is recommended for contemporary literature fans looking for something out of the ordinary. ... Also recommended for students of literature, psychology, and philosophy, as the distinctive writing style and creative insight into the minds of one family deserve analysis. Kirkus Reviews wrote, "For those who like their prose fresh out of a cleaner and more traditional wellspring, Blake's writing can prove tedious at best and arduous at worst. But for those who lean toward writing that is more visceral, taxing or outright demanding of the reader, this might be the right cup of tea".

== Bibliography ==
- Ever (novella) (Calamari Press, 2009)
- Scorch Atlas (novel-in-stories) (Featherproof Books, 2010)
- There Is No Year (novel) (Harper Perennial, 2011)
- Nothing: A Portrait of Insomnia (memoir) (Harper Perennial, 2011)
- Sky Saw (novel) (Tyrant Books, 2012)
- One (novel) (Roof Books, 2012)
- 300,000,000 (novel) (Harper Perennial, 2014)
- Alice Knott (novel) (Penguin Random House, 2020)
- Aannex (novel) (Apocalypse Party, 2022)
- Molly (memoir) (Archway Editions, 2023)
- UXA.GOV (novel) (Inside the Castle, 2024)
- Void Corporation (novel) (reissue of Alice Knott) (Archway Editions, 2024)
