= Jack Bankowsky =

American art critic

Jack Bankowsky was the Editor-in-Chief of Artforum throughout the 1990s (1992–2003) and the founding editor of Artforum's sister publication, Bookforum, where he was editor from 1996 to 1998. He is currently Editor-at-Large of Artforum and a freelance critic and curator. Bankowsky has served on the juries of Takashi Murakami's GEISAI art fair and the Venice Biennale, and his controversial contemporary survey exhibition, "Pop Life: Art in a Material World," (co-curated with Alison Gingeras and Catherine Wood) opened at Tate Modern in the fall of 2009 before traveling to the Hamburger Kunsthalle in Germany and the National Gallery of Canada. A visiting scholar at Yale University in the fall of 2004 and 2005, and at UCLA in 2008, he has lectured extensively on contemporary art. Recent writings have addressed the art of David Hammons, Louise Lawler, Jason Rhoades and Richard Prince. Bankowsky's essay "Ciao Rensselaerville," on the latter artist's work, appears in the catalogue of his 2007 Solomon R. Guggenheim Museum retrospective.
