= Joseph Brodak =

American bank robber

Joseph Brodak is a Michigan man who committed serial bank robbery in the Metro Detroit area in the early 1990s and again in early 2000. Brodak was dubbed the "Mario Brothers Bandit" by the FBI because the disguise he wore (a large fake moustache, suspenders, and a newsboy cap) bore a resemblance to the main characters in the video game Super Mario Bros. Brodak was charged with 11 bank robberies over the course of the summer of 1994. Brodak was an employee at the Tech Center at General Motors in Warren, Michigan, when he lost his job for stealing a Chevrolet Corvette from the employee parking lot. In order to keep up with his gambling debts, Brodak robbed 11 banks over two months, accruing only about $44,000 in the process. Casino chips and horse racing slips were found in his possession when he was arrested, along with the disguise in plain view on the backseat of his car. He was sentenced to 10 years for Felony Bank Robbery, a sentence of which he served seven years.

After his release, Brodak resumed working for General Motors but fell behind in gambling debts again, and reverted to bank robbery again in January 2009, robbing a bank in Warren, Michigan. Pursued by a witness at the scene, Brodak was apprehended by police after a short pursuit with dye pack smoke fuming from his car. He received 10 years, well below the sentencing guidelines, due to his age and reported trauma from PTSD stemming from his service in the Vietnam War. Stephen Pasden Jr., the witness who followed Brodak and led to his capture, was given a commendation for his good citizenship by the Warren City Police Commissioner.

Brodak is subject of the memoir Bandit, written by his daughter Molly Brodak.
