= Jessica Hopper =

American writer (born 1976)

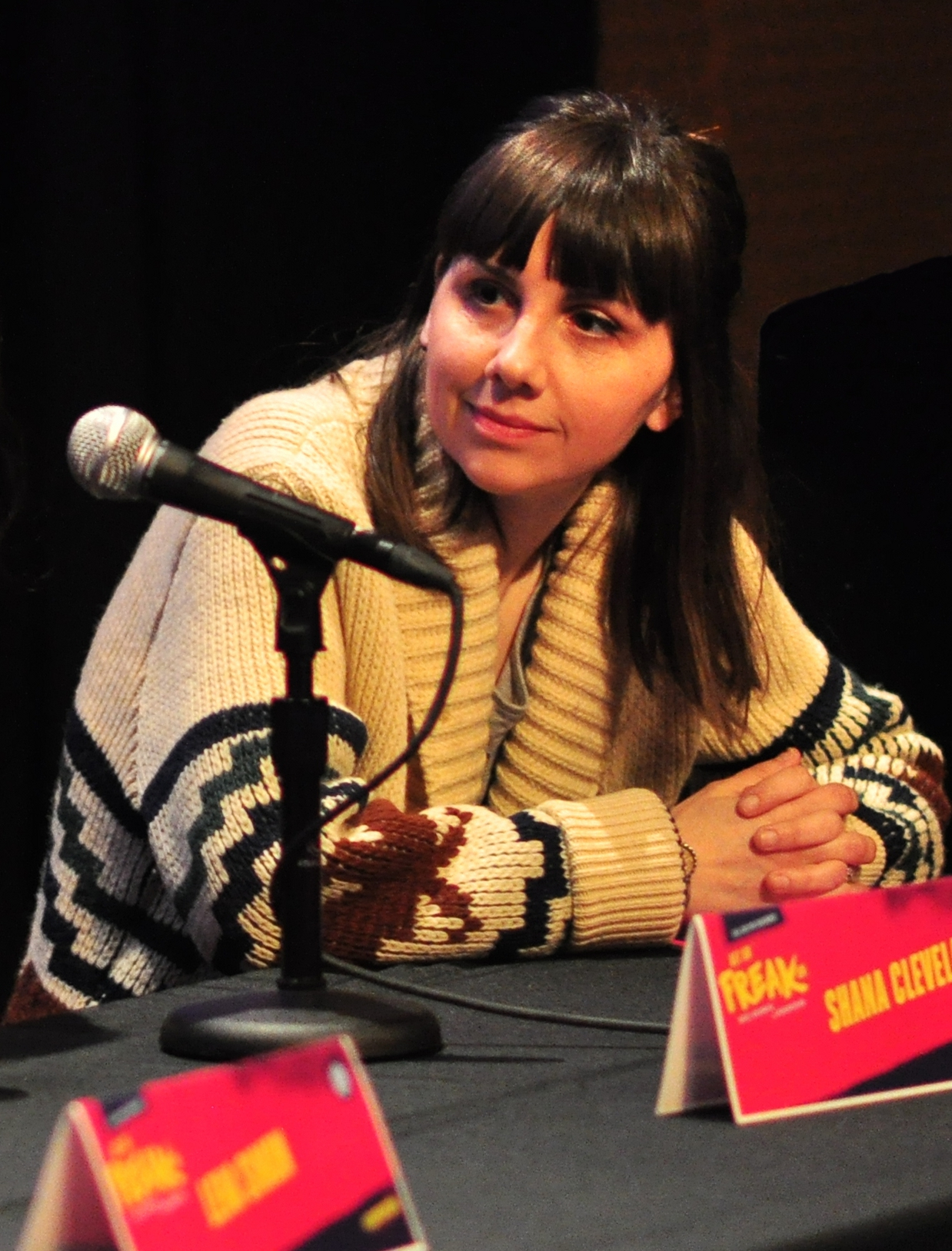
- Jessica Hopper at the EMP Pop Festival 2015.
- Born: September 5, 1976 (age 50); Indiana, USA
- Occupations: Author; Music critic Editor
- Writing career
- Language: English
- Years active: 1995-present
- Genres: Criticism, journalism
- Subjects: Music, feminism
- Notable works: The First Collection of Criticism by a Living Female Rock Critic; Night Moves

Jessica Hopper (born September 5, 1976) is an American writer. She published The First Collection of Criticism by a Living Female Rock Critic, a compilation of her essays, reported pieces, zines, and reviews, in May 2015. In 2018, she published a memoir, Night Moves.

== Early life ==
Jessica Hopper was born in Indiana and grew up in Minneapolis. Her mother was a newspaper editor, her father a journalist and her stepfather a prosecutor, all of which Hopper has described as fueling her interest in journalism and investment in finding the truth more generally. She began writing criticism as a teenager, spurred by a frustrated sense that a magazine had misunderstood one of her favorite bands, Babes in Toyland—the piece, Hopper recalled later, characterized the music as "caustic and shrieky" where Hopper found "these aesthetics...really empowering"—at 15 years old, Hopper called the magazine to argue they should publish new review written by her. The magazine didn't respond, but Hopper started her own fanzine. By the next year, she began freelancing for the alternative weekly City Pages.

A feminist punk, Hopper was encouraged by music critic Terri Sutton to find her own "staunch and caustic and uncompromising" voice.

== Career ==
Hopper has written for publications including the Chicago Tribune, The Chicago Reader, Rolling Stone, The Guardian, the New York Times, National Public Radio, Punk Planet, the Los Angeles Times, Village Voice, and Spin. She was a music supervisor for This American Life and the first music editor of the radical teen-girl webzine Rookie. From 1991 to 2005, she published the fanzine Hit It Or Quit It.

Alongside her writing, Hopper worked in public relations and managing bands until her late 20s when she quit to write full-time.

Hopper was a senior editor of Pitchfork and the editor in chief of the print quarterly The Pitchfork Review from October 2014 until November 2015. She was appointed editorial director of music for MTV News in 2016.

Writing in The Guardian in 2015, Laura Snapes described Hopper as "one of a handful of music journalists whose every new piece feels like an event. When Björk's album Vulnicura leaked, it was Hopper’s interview that provided the record's heartbreaking context." In Paste, Mack Hayden described Hopper's as "one of the most distinctive voices in the world of music criticism."

NPR critic Mariya Karimjee praised Night Moves as a "a special blend of being present and feeling simultaneously nostalgic, looking at a block in any city that you love so much, and thinking of everything that's already changed and will change."

In 2019, Hopper co-wrote and served as showrunner for KCRW's Lost Notes podcast series, which focused on the evolution of artist legacies. In 2024, she then directed the podcast series Groupies: The Women of the Sunset Strip from the Pill to Punk for KCRW and National Public Radio. Hopper also directed a four-part documentary series called Women Who Rock, which debuted in July 2022 on EPIX. In 2025, Hopper was the producer for Courtney Love's Women, a podcast series narrated by Courtney Love and Rob Harvilla, for BBC. Her 2019 Vanity Fair piece (written with Sasha Geffen and Jenn Pelly) on the oral history of Lilith Fair later inspired the making of the 2025 Hulu documentary Lilith Fair: Building a Mystery, for which Hopper served as an executive producer.

Hopper serves as an editor of the American Music Series at the University of Texas Press. She is currently working on a book about women musicians (among them Joni Mitchell) in the year 1975.

== Personal life ==
Hopper is based in Chicago. She has two children.

== Bibliography ==
- The Girls' Guide to Rocking: How to Start a Band, Book Gigs, and Get Rolling to Rock Stardom (June 4, 2009) ISBN 0761151419. Workman Publishing
- The First Collection of Criticism by a Living Female Rock Critic (May 12, 2015) ISBN 978-0983186335, Featherproof Books
- Night Moves (September 18, 2018) ISBN 9781477317884, University of Texas Press
- The First Collection of Criticism by a Living Female Rock Critic (Revised and Expanded second edition). (July 6, 2021) ISBN 9780374538996, MCD x FSG Originals
