= Alice Knott =

Novel by American author Blake Butler

- First edition
- Author: Blake Butler
- Publisher: Riverhead Books
- Publication place: United States

Void Corporation
- Paperback and subsequent editions
- Author: Blake Butler
- Publisher: Archway Editions
- Publication place: United States

Alice Knott is a 2020 novel by American author Blake Butler. The novel concerns the theft and destruction of a painting collection and its impact on the painting's original owner, the titular Alice Knott.

In 2024 it was re-released in paperback by Archway Editions as Void Corporation.

== Development and writing ==
Butler's earliest inspiration for the book was a note written to himself reading “Corporation that buys and destroys art”. He was further inspired by the Thomas Pynchon novel The Crying of Lot 49.

== Reception ==
In The New York Times, Lauren Wilkinson wrote “There’s an exceptional amount of intention and control on display in the telling of this story. . . . Don’t expect a conventional reading experience. Alice Knott is a meditation on art and perception whose form seems to serve as both a meta-comment on the function of the novel, and a challenge to the expectations that a reader should bring to one. It’s rare for me to enjoy and value a book on those terms, but this one worked for me. And even more to the point, I respected it for insisting that I rise to its challenge.”

In Los Angeles Review of Books, John Domini wrote that the "constant worrying at what’s genuinely personal, struggling to detach it from the endless play of light across wall and screen, strikes me as an undeniably contemporary project.”
