= Tim Griffin (curator) =

American curator

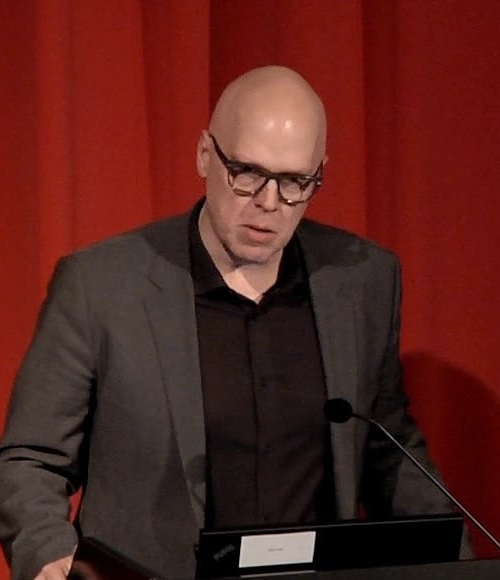
- Tim Griffin giving a lecture at Deutsches Filminstitut & Filmmuseum in 2019
- Education: Columbia University (BA); Bard College (MFA)
- Occupation: Chief curator (2011–2021)
- Organization: The Kitchen
- Successor: Legacy Russell
- Spouse: Johanna Burton

Tim Griffin is an American writer, curator and former editor. He served as the director and chief curator of the Kitchen. He was editor-in-chief of Artforum from 2003 to 2010.

== Biography ==
Griffin received a B.A. from Columbia University in 1992. At Columbia, he was a student of French literary critic Sylvère Lotringer. He then received a MFA from the Milton Avery Graduate School of the Arts of Bard College in 1999. He worked as a musician, playing trumpet in several ensembles, a theater producer, and an art curator before entering journalism as the art editor at Time Out New York.

From 2003 to 2010, Griffin was editor-in-chief of Artforum, where he was credited for transforming the magazine's art criticism into social, political and intellectual movements. He was editor at large of the magazine until joining experimental art center the Kitchen as director and chief curator in 2011. As director, Griffin oversaw projects by artists including Chantal Akerman, Charles Atlas, and Gretchen Bender. He also developed new initiatives and programs including the L.A.B., an interdisciplinary discussion series. He stepped from the directorship down in 2021.

He was named a Chevalier of the Ordre des Arts et des Lettres by the French government in 2015. He was also a visiting associate professor in the art history and English departments at Ohio State University.

== Personal life ==
Griffin is married to Johanna Burton, director of the ICA Philadelphia.
