= 300,000,000 =

2014 novel by Blake Butler

- Cover of the first edition paperback of 300,000,000 by Blake Butler.
- Author: Blake Butler
- Language: English
- Genre: Crime fiction, horror fiction, transgressive fiction
- Publisher: Harper Perennial
- Publication date: October 14, 2014
- Pages: 456
- ISBN: 978-0-062-27185-3

300,000,000, or also referred to as Three Hundred Million, is a 2014 novel by American writer Blake Butler. Butler created the novel from his preconception of Roberto Bolaño's novel 2666. Inspired by 2666, the story is formatted in five sections with titles that start with "The Part About...". 300,000,000 was written over the course of two years writing every day, and a took a further two years of revising. It is a satire on the commented oversaturation of murder, gore, and crime in American television as stated by Butler.

The character Darrel has been influenced by Bob from the TV series Twin Peaks.

== Plot ==
The five sections of the novel are "The Part About Gravey", "The Part About the Killing", "The Part About Flood (In the City of Sod)", "The Part About America", and "The Part About Darrel".

The first section is the transcribed journal of the cult leader Gretch Gravey's notebook. Gravey is a cult leader and mass murderer who envisions the world's population should be condensed into one single body. The cult he leads consists of teenage boys seeking drugs from Gravey, and in exchange they bring back "mothers", women of all ages, to Gravey to be ritualistically raped, murdered, dismembered, or cannibalized. Gravey is connected to the murders of 440 people, including some of his own cult members, and hundreds of bodies of the victims are stacked in his home he calls the Black House.

The transcriber of the journal is police detective E.N. Flood and is an unreliable narrator, supposedly going insane from investigating Gravey's crimes. Flood investigates the site of the mass grave, and underneath is an underworld meant to become the City of Sod, similar to the living world except devoid of people, that Flood becomes trapped in. Later, Gravey is arrested but everyone who comes into contact with Gravey goes insane and become commit killing sprees. Mass killings spread wider and death tolls spread in the wider area until it infects the whole of the United States with the death toll every day until the entire population of 300,000,000 are killed.

== Reception ==
Most reception of the novel point out its gorey prose, satire, and subversive nature, leaving positive reviews from Publishers Weekly, NPR, and The Millions.

Transgressive fiction authors Dennis Cooper and Alissa Nutting, author of Tampa, leave positive reviews including quote from Nutting: "[It] draws us into the darkest circles of human motivation. You’ll think about it daily and return to it compulsively; it will leave you with fever dreams of the highest possible resolution."
