= Scorch Atlas =

2009 short story collection

- Author: Blake Butler
- Genre: Literary fiction
- Publisher: Featherproof Books
- Publication date: 2009
- ISBN: 9780977199280

Scorch Atlas: A Belated Primer is a 2009 short story collection written by Blake Butler and published by Featherproof Books. It is a work of post-apocalyptic fiction with a despairing outlook.

== Background and publication ==
Blake Butler is the author of several books, including Ever (2009), Nothing: A Portrait of Insomnia (2011), and There Is No Year (2011). Featherproof Books published Butler's Scorch Atlas in 2009, a 188-page collection of 13 short stories in the post-apocalyptic fiction genre. The book is designed to appear damaged; one reviewer writes that "the thing seems charred [...] splattered with blood and ink".

== Reception ==
Literary critic Lee Quinby writes that although Scorch Atlas presents a powerful image of post-apocalyptic life, its descriptions are so despairing that readers may experience "boredom in the face of repeated anguish". Anne-Laurre Tissut, a scholar of American literature, writes that the text "absorbs the reader" through its language and its focus on the body. Tissut particularly comments on the representation of the body in "Television Milk", writing that in Butler's writing, "the essence of life is summed up here". Reviewer Nina MacLaughlin writes that the essential point of the novel is not "narrative arc or character development" but the accumulation of particular images and words.
