= Wade Guyton =

American artist

- Born: 1972 (age 53–54); Hammond, Indiana, US
- Education: University of Tennessee and Hunter College
- Known for: Conceptual art, installation art, painting

Wade Guyton (born 1972) is an American post-conceptual artist who among other things makes digital paintings on canvas using scanners and digital inkjet technology.

== Early life and education ==
Guyton was born in Hammond, Indiana, in 1972, and grew up in the small town of Lake City, Tennessee. His father, who died when Guyton was two, and his stepfather, also deceased, were both steelworkers. Guyton's mother, a homemaker, sometimes worked as a secretary at the Catholic church the family attended. Guyton completed a BA (1995) at the University of Tennessee, Knoxville. He moved to New York in 1996, was twice rejected for admission to the Whitney Independent Study Program, and did MFA program coursework (1996–1998) at the Hunter College.

== Early career ==
While at Hunter College, Guyton had among his teachers Robert Morris. Guyton landed his first job at St. Mark's Bookshop in the East Village and then worked at Dia:Chelsea as a guard. When Dia closed its Chelsea space in 2004, his severance pay allowed him to continue renting an East Village studio and apartment without having to look for another job. He won the Foundation for Contemporary Arts Grants to Artists award (2004).

== Career ==
=== Artistic practice ===
Guyton's early "drawings" from around 2003, are filled with black X's over ripped-out book pages. The color black and the letter X became signature motifs. His tool is an Epson Stylus Pro 9600 inkjet printer, a machine used for large-format prints. Using a computer, Guyton produces paintings. Since 2005, Guyton has worked on canvas. Typically Guyton's work is exhibited in a series.

In a 2004 statement, Guyton said:

Recently I've been using Epson inkjet printers and flatbed scanners as tools to make works that act like drawings, paintings, even sculptures. I spend a lot of time with books and so logically I've ended up using pages from books as material- pages torn from books and fed through an inkjet printer. I've been using a very pared down vocabulary of simple shapes and letters drawn or typed in Microsoft Word, then printed on top of these pages from catalogues, magazines, posters- and even blank canvas. The resulting images aren't exactly what the machines are designed for - slick digital photographs. There is often a struggle between the printer and my material - and the traces of this are left on the surface: snags, drips, streaks, mis-registrations, blurs.

New York Times Paintings

Untitled (2020–2021) at Glenstone in 2022

In November 2016, Guyton exhibits a new series of New York Times Paintings that show headlines about violence around the world and news leading up to the 2016 US Presidential Election. The exhibition opens the day after Hillary Clinton loses the election to Donald Trump.

Jason Farago in the New York Times writes "Mr. Guyton's paintings … do not depict pages of a newspaper at all — they depict the website of a media company that publishes news in many formats. That is a significant difference. As he told The Times in 2012, "I chose the computer because it was right here" — and while making screenshots of the website permits this least emotional of painters a rare dose of topicality, Mr. Guyton also treats nytimes.com as a kind of default."

The Serpentine Gallery in London described Guyton's work as underscoring, "The studio's potential, not just as a locus for discussion and production, but as a material in and of itself." His exhibition Das New Yorker Atelier in 2017 was a collaboration with Museum Brandhorst in Munich, Germany. Guyton exhibited paintings that depicted artworks in process in his studio on the Lower East Side of Manhattan. Three studio assistants are also depicted in a moment of conversation in the kitchen of his studio. The title of the exhibition makes a reference to a painting by Swiss artist Hans Jakob Oeri entitled Das Pariser Atelier.

In 2018, Guyton made another work that shows studio assistants from behind scrutinizing a work on the wall. The exhibition Patagonia presumably took its title from the graphics printed on the T-shirt of one of the figures in the painting.

=== Artist associations ===
Guyton also makes collaborative works with fellow artists Kelley Walker and Stephen Prina. Along with artists like Walker, Seth Price and Tauba Auerbach, Guyton is regarded by some to be at the forefront of a generation that has been reconsidering both appropriation art and abstract art through the 21st-century lens of digital technology. He is regarded as one of many contemporary painters revisiting late Modernism, alongside Tomma Abts, Mark Grotjahn, Eileen Quinlan, Sergei Jensen, and Cheyney Thompson.

Guyton and Price operate the Leopard Press, which releases publications of their work and that of their friends.

== Exhibitions ==
In 2003, Guyton exhibited at Power House Memphis. Between 2004 and 2014, exhibitions of his work were held at Kunstverein Hamburg; Portikus, Frankfurt am Main; Museum Ludwig, Cologne; Museum Dhondt-Dhaenens, Belgium; Whitney Museum of American Art, New York; Kunsthaus Bregenz, Austria; Wiener Secession, Vienna; Kunsthalle Zürich, Zürich. In 2005, then-MoMA PS1 director Klaus Biesenbach included Guyton's inkjet panels in a room with fellow newcomers Seth Price and Josh Smith. The following year, curators Daniel Birnbaum and Hans Ulrich Obrist included Guyton/Walker's brightly colored stacks of paint cans in their "Uncertain States of America" survey at Astrup Fearnley Museum of Modern Art in Oslo.

In 2009, Guyton and Kelley Walker were invited by Birnbaum to participate at the Venice Biennale, where they exhibited canvases and pieces of drywall at the Palazzo delle Esposizioni. For his 2012 retrospective at the Whitney Museum, Guyton created walls inspired by temporary partitions Marcel Breuer had made for the building in the 1960s.

In 2019, the Museum Ludwig in Cologne, Germany organized a twenty-year retrospective of Guyton's work. It was his third exhibition at the museum which has one of the largest collections of his works to date. The exhibition curated by Yilmaz Dziewior included 200 paintings, sculptures, a survey of works on paper, early photography and recent bronze sculptures. The exhibition catalogue was published by Verlag Walther Koenig.

In an interview with Nicolas Trembley, Guyton says of the unusual organization of the exhibition, "It was the building that refused the chronological show, since some paintings need particular walls to be shown against. From there the exhibition could develop in a more unusual way, picking up lots of loose conceptual threads and temporarily making thematic narratives, or performing a more conventional pedagogical function. I also needed to figure out a way to keep myself interested in looking at all this old work, because this kind of retrospective thinking can sometimes get a little bit boring."

In 2021, Guyton presented The Undoing, a suite of 26 paintings documenting his experience during the pandemic. Guyton started these paintings during the lockdown in 2020. Images include news from the New York Times website, Guyton taking his temperature, and photographs taken during his exhibition at the Museum Ludwig in Cologne, which closed just before the start of the pandemic. The paintings were exhibited again at Glenstone Museum in Potomac in 2022.

== Collections ==
Guyton's works are in the collections of the Museum of Modern Art, New York; the Whitney Museum of American Art, New York; the Museum of Contemporary Art, Los Angeles; the Centre Pompidou in Paris; the Art Institute of Chicago; the Carnegie Museum in Pittsburgh, the Kunstmuseum Basel; the Pinakothek der Moderne in Munich; Museum Ludwig, Cologne; Kunsthaus Zürich; Museum of Contemporary Art, Chicago; San Francisco Museum of Modern Art; Princeton University Art Museum; Dallas Museum of Art; FRAC, Ile de France; and the Musee d'Art Moderne et Contemporain in Geneva.

== Art market ==
As of 2013, Guyton's works regularly sell for more than $1 million at auction and privately. An untitled Epson UltraChrome inkjet on linen of 2005 established an auction record for Guyton when it sold for $2.4 million at Christie's New York in 2013. In 2014, his flame painting Untitled (Fire, Red/Black U) (2005) sold to an unidentified telephone bidder for $3.525 million at Christie's, New York. Days before the auction, Guyton, disgusted by the enormous price expected, went on the offensive printing multiple copies of the painting and posted them on Instagram a few days before the auction. The painting was rumored to be guaranteed at $4 million.

Guyton's works along with Rudolf Stingel and Christopher Wool were at the center of the Inigo Philbrick case in which collectors were defrauded.

Guyton works with Matthew Marks Gallery from New York, Galleria Gió Marconi in Milan, Galerie Gisela Capitain from Cologne, Galerie Francesca Pia from Zurich and Galerie Chantal Crousel in Paris.

== Catalogues ==
- Buchhandlung Walther König, Köln, 2006 Color, Power & Style, ISBN 978-3-86560-089-9
- Buchhandlung Walther König, Köln, 2010 Zeichnungen für ein großes Bild, ISBN 978-3-86560-814-7

== See also ==
- Inkjet technology
