= Kelley Walker =

American post-conceptual artist (born 1969)

Kelley Walker (born 1969 Columbus, Georgia) is an American post-conceptual artist who lives and works in New York City. He uses advertising and digital media to make "paintings" using screen printing and/or digital printing technologies. His art appropriates iconic cultural images, altering them to highlight underlying issues of American politics and consumerism. He produces work collaboratively with artist Wade Guyton under the name Guyton\Walker.

== Education ==
Walker graduated with a BFA from the University of Tennessee in 1995, and graduated from The University of Arizona with an MFA in 1998.

== Art work ==
Walker often presents large-scale billboard-like canvases set at 90 degree angles, sometimes splattered with abstracted patterns in symbolic white color and chocolate, such as in his Black Star Press from 2006, a digital painting triptych on canvas. Walker’s gestures mimic violence, merging ethical corruption with graffiti and pop art. He also makes sculpture and installation art.

Since 2005, Walker has been working with bricks, first entirely in silkscreen and later adding collaged printed material. Created between 2013–14, his identically sized, 2.5-meter tall canvases of powdery silkscreened bricks are lined and separated with fragments of pages from the Italian architecture and design magazine Domus. In each one of the paintings, Walker begins by scanning individual bricks, which he then arranges into a stacked alignment and silkscreens using a four-color process.

== Exhibitions ==
Walker has been the subject of solo and two-person exhibitions at WIELS in Brussels, Belgium; Le Magasin in Grenoble, France; Modern Art Oxford in Oxford, United Kingdom; and Museum De Hallen, Haarlem in The Netherlands. His work was included in the 2005 Greater New York exhibition at P.S.1 Contemporary Art Center in New York and USA Today at the Royal Academy in London. He participated in the 7th Sharjah Biennial, the 2006 Whitney Biennial, and the 2007 Lyon Biennale.

== Collections ==
Walker's work has been acquired by the Museum of Modern Art, Whitney Museum of American Art, Albright-Knox Art Gallery, Institute of Contemporary Art in Boston, Carnegie Museum of Art, and Sammlung Goetz in Munich.

== Gallery representation ==
Walker is represented by Paula Cooper Gallery, New York; Thomas Dane Gallery, London; Capitain Petzel Gallery, Berlin; Galerie Gisela Capitain, Cologne; Galleria Massimo De Carlo, Milan; and Galerie Catherine Bastide, Brussels.

== Controversy ==
On September 17, 2016 Kelley Walker became the center of major controversy after giving an opening artist talk for his show, Direct Drive, at the Contemporary Art Museum St. Louis. Controversy arose after Walker avoided audience questions regarding his intent in using racial imagery and symbolism. As a consequence there was much backlash against Walker, CAM STL, and head curator Jeffrey Uslip, who resigned two weeks later.
