= Korakrit Arunanondchai =

Video and multimedia artist

- Born: November 24, 1986 (age 39); Bangkok, Thailand
- Known for: Film, painting, performance art, sculpture
- Movement: Avant-garde, modernism
- Awards: Ammodo Tiger Short Award (2018)

Korakrit Arunanondchai (Thai: กรกฤต อรุณานนท์ชัย) is a video and multimedia artist originally from Bangkok who now splits his time between Brooklyn and Bangkok. He is best known for his 2017 installation, With history in a room filled with people with funny names 4, which received widely positive reviews and was recognized with an award at the International Film Festival Rotterdam.

== Early life ==
Arunanondchai was born in Bangkok, Thailand in 1986. His father was a first-generation Thai whose family had immigrated from China, while his mother grew up in several countries due to her father's position as a diplomat. He acquired an interest in the arts through music, which expanded to include visual art while studying at NIST International School in Bangkok. Upon graduating from NIST, he attended Rhode Island School of Design and graduated with a Bachelor of Fine Arts in 2009 before going on to earn a Master of Fine Arts from Columbia University School of the Arts in 2012.

== Career ==
Shortly after the completion of his MFA, Arunanondchai was named as one of the 2013 recipients of the Emerging Artist Grant from the Hort Mann Foundation, an award intended to support promising New York-based artists. His first professional work included participation in group showings at the SculptureCenter and Fisher Landau Center, as well as solo exhibitions in New York and Brussels. In 2014 Museum of Modern Art hosted his first solo museum exhibition, 2012-2055, which included both videos and paintings that explored the concept of transformation and his own evolution as an artist.

In 2018 Arunanondchai received the Ammodo Tiger Short Award at the International Film Festival Rotterdam for With history in a room filled with people with funny names 4, the fourth entry in his ongoing film series Together with history in a room filled with people with funny names. That same year he released the fifth entry, No history in a room filled with people with funny names 5, and also launched a Bangkok video-art festival with the inaugural event Ghost:2561, highlighting the connections between Thailand's strong tradition of animism and contemporary art. In 2019, Arunanonschai was commissioned by the Performa 19 biennial for which he created the performance Together. During the COVID-19 pandemic in 2020, a planned exhibition in New York was postponed due to the rapid spread of the coronavirus throughout the city. However, Arunanondchai's newest video exploring the death of his grandfather, Songs for dying, was shown in 2021 at the Kunsthall Trondheim gallery in Norway and at the Gwangju Biennale in South Korea.
