= PowerHouse Books =

American publishing house

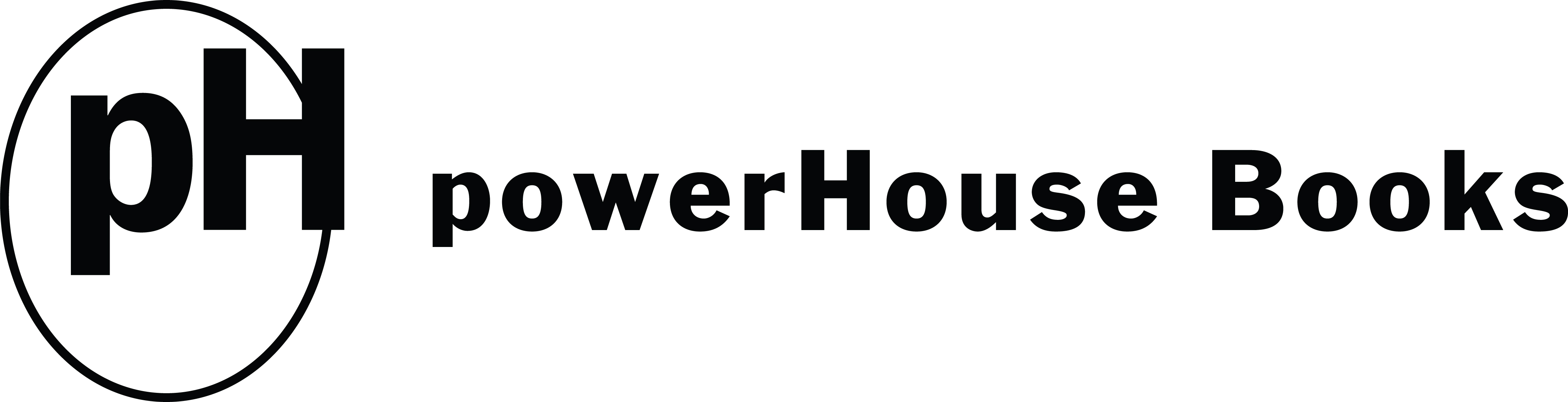
- Founded: 1995
- Founder: Daniel Power
- Country of origin: United States
- Headquarters location: Brooklyn, New York City
- Distribution: Simon & Schuster
- Publication types: Books
- Nonfiction topics: photography
- Official website: www.powerhousebooks.com

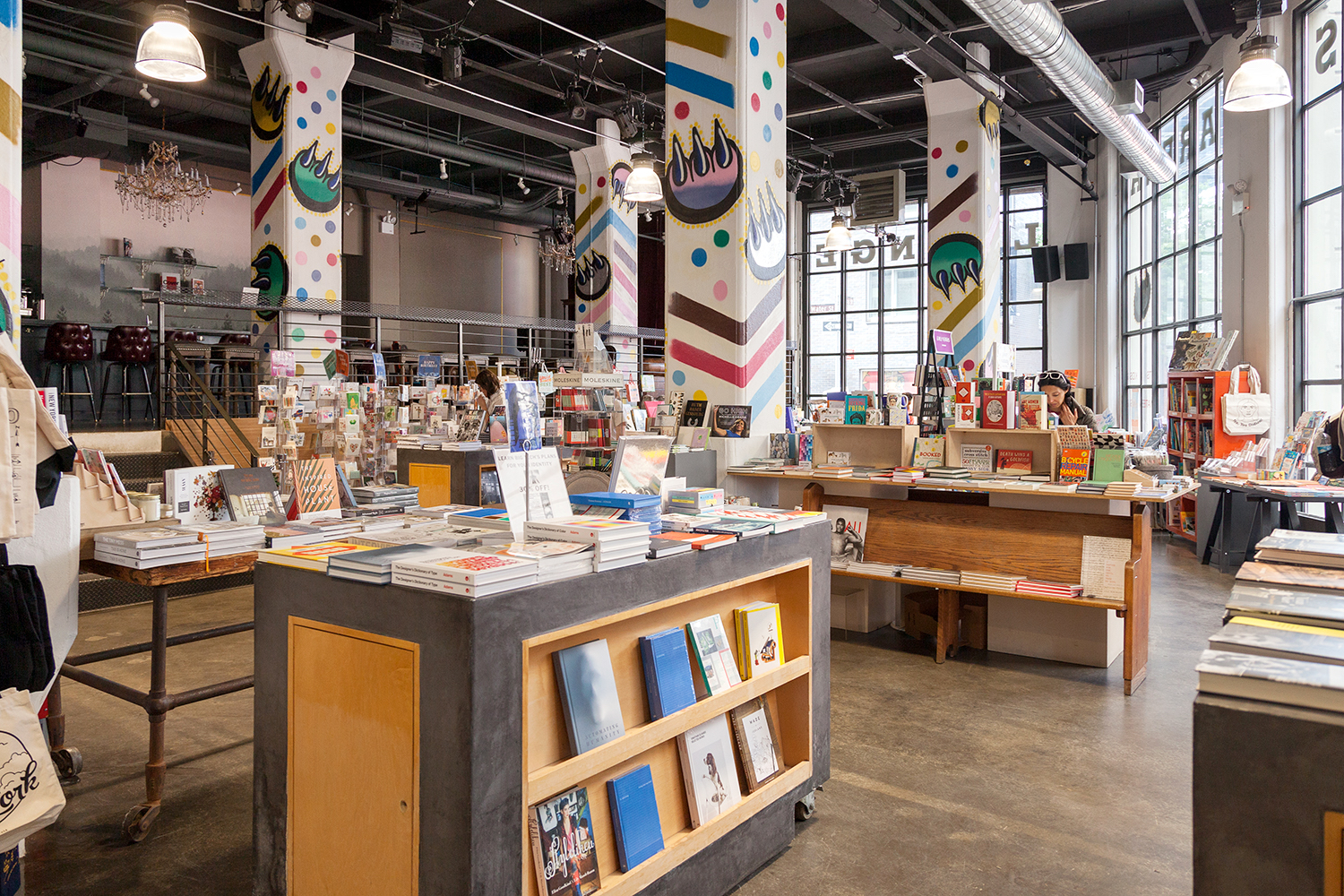
Interior of PowerHouse Arena Bookstore, 2019

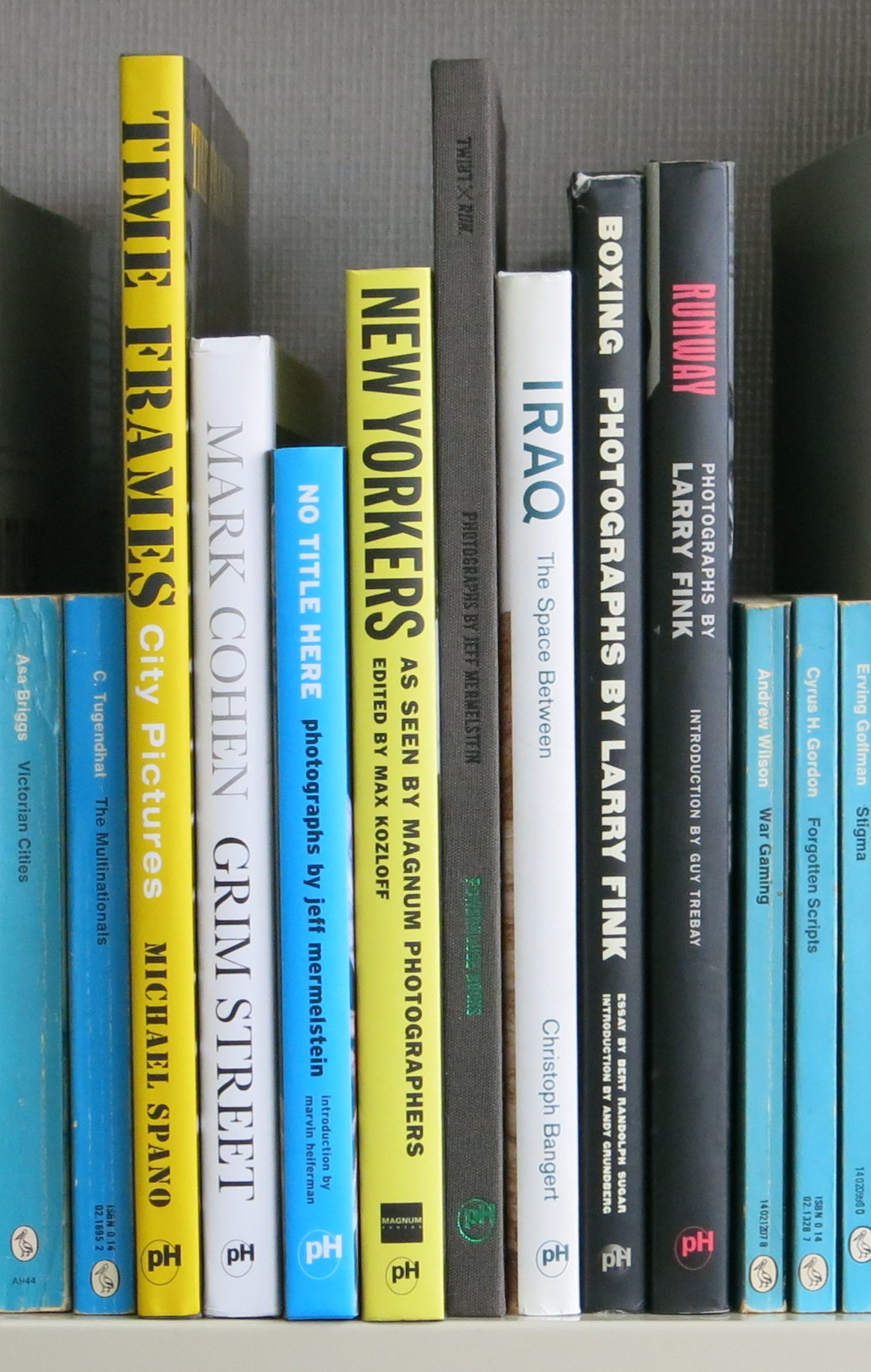
Photobooks – by Max Kozloff (ed), Christoph Bangert, Mark Cohen, Larry Fink, Jeff Mermelstein, and Michael Spano – from PowerHouse (among unrelated Pelicans)

PowerHouse Books (stylized as powerHouse Books) is an independent publisher of art and photography books founded in 1995 by Daniel Power, in Brooklyn, with its headquarters in Industry City. PowerHouse Books is closely affiliated with Powerhouse Bookstores, a chain of independent bookstores also owned by Daniel Power, with its flagship location on the waterfront of DUMBO in The PowerHouse Arena at 28 Adams Street. Powerhouse Books also operates a children's' publishing division, POW!

== Publishing and other activities ==
Founded in 1995 by Daniel Power from his apartment on the Lower East Side, PowerHouse Books is known for its "Image Driven" publishing, particularly in street culture, popular culture, fashion, politics and fine arts. Its first best-seller was Women Before 10AM, by Veronique Vial, with a foreword by Sean Penn, published in 1998. In 2011, PowerHouse published Vivian Maier: Street Photographer, which brought posthumous attention to the previously unknown photographer, including the Academy Award-nominated film Finding Vivian Maier.

In 2006, powerHouse Books launched The PowerHouse Arena, a gallery, bookstore, and event space often used to promote artists working with the publisher. Initially located at 37 Main Street, Powerhouse Arena moved to 28 Adams Street in 2015. In 2020, PowerHouse Books opened a new location in Industry City, and moved its corporate publishing headquarters there.

It also publishes artists known for work in other fields. It partnered with Charlie Ahearn on Wild Style: The Sampler, a behind-the-scenes look at Ahearn's 1982 Wild Style, considered the first hip hop film. Visual artists published include John Lurie, Francesco Clemente, Richard Prince, Kehinde Wiley, and George Condo. Actors and filmmakers published include Diane Keaton, Jeff Bridges, Richard Lewis, Jessica Lange, David Lynch, and Brett Ratner. Musicians include Richard Hell, DJ Stretch Armstrong, Michael Bolton, Mike McCready, KRS-One, Gene Simmons, and The Beastie Boys.

PowerHouse Books launched, "POW! Kids Books" in 2013, which it described as "a woke kids' book line"

In 2019 Chris Molnar (of The Writer's Block) and Nic Nicoludis established and ran a literary imprint called Archway Editions with Naomi Falk, which published work by Ishmael Reed, Christopher Coe, John Farris, Paul Schrader, Claire Donato, Stacy Szymaszek, Blake Butler, Alice Notley, and more, including anthologies from cokemachineglow as well as the Unpublishable and Archways reading series.

== Controversies ==
=== War is Beautiful ===
In 2017, PowerHouse Books published "War Is Beautiful: The New York Times Pictoral Guide to the Glamour of Armed Conflict* (in which the author explains why he no longer reads The New York Times)," by David Shields. Shields had licensed photography from the Times to support his book's thesis that the Times over-glamorized conflict, especially the Iraq War, promoting popular support for the war and elongating the conflict. Although the photos had been properly licensed, The Times invoiced PowerHouse Books $19,000 for the book's inside back cover, which featured 64 thumbnails depicting the photos on the front page of the Times. When PowerHouse refused to pay, the Times sued to collect.

PowerHouse sued Shields for claiming that the thumbnails were covered under fair use, but defended the book, claiming that the Times was attempting to chill free speech. The Daily Beast reported that the Times had initially wanted change the book's subtitle and insert a disclaimer making clear the book wasn't affiliated with the Times, but that PowerHouse refused to do so.

== Publications ==
- All of a Sudden by American photographer Jack Pierson, 1995
- The Destruction of Lower Manhattan by American photographer Danny Lyon, reissue of 1969 book in 2008
- Yes We Can: Barack Obama's History-Making Presidential Campaign featuring work of Armenian-American photojournalist Scout Tufankjian; the first printing of 55,000 copies sold out a month before its scheduled release, prompting a second printing of 25,000.
