= Montez Press Radio =

Radio station and performance space in Manhattan, New York

- MPR
- Location: 46 Canal Street; Manhattan, New York City

Construction
- Opened: 2019

Website
- radio.montezpress.com

Montez Press Radio (also known as MPR) is a New York-based internet radio station, performance space, and non-profit arts organization. The platform was founded in 2018 by Montez Press founder Anna Clark, Stacy Skolnik, and Thomas Laprade. Montez Press Radio is directly inspired by pirate radio, public-access television, and DIY culture more broadly. In a profile for The New York Times, writer Ezra Marcus wrote that that station has "penetrating reach into the underground dimensions of the city's art, literature, nightlife and music scenes." It is located in (and is occasionally associated with) Lower Manhattan's Dimes Square "microneighborhood."

Past contributors to Montez Press Radio programming include Hua Hsu, John Early and Theda Hammel, John Wilson, Screen Slate, Mykki Blanco, Dean Kissick, Naomi Falk, Chris Molnar, Frost Children, Miho Hatori, Laraaji, Shayne Oliver, Archway Editions, Legacy Russell, Alphonse Pierre, Shannon Briggs, Isaac Julien, Julianna Huxtable, Gary Indiana, Jon Caramanica, Gary Wilson, bar Italia, Moor Mother, Seth Price, Evilgiane, Joanne Robertson, Cities Aviv, Ebony Haynes, Nina Protocol, Honor Levy and Walter Pearce, Joshua Citarella, Victoria Campbell, Sam Kestenbaum and The Drunken Canal.

== History ==
Montez Press Radio began in 2018 as a temporary performance experiment organized by the team behind the London, Hamburg, and New York-based independent book publisher Montez Press, "a vital contributor to artist-led publishing over the last decade, foregrounding and queering experimental auto, fan and speculative fiction."

MPR's initial broadcast took place in the space of David Lieske's Mathew Gallery on Canal Street, while the space was closed for the summer. Their inaugural August 2018 broadcast was solely transmitted via a pirate radio antenna, whose signal only spanned a few surrounding blocks. The broadcast was 12 hours long (lasting from 11am to 11pm). The project was only intended to last for 30 days, but programming continued beyond the initial timeframe, eventually becoming a permanent project in January 2019. In 2019, Montez Press Radio took over Mathew Gallery space at 46 Canal St, where Montez Press Radio is headquartered today.

As of October 2024, they have broadcast nearly 3000 unique radio programs, which are all available on their website. They have a strong international presence. In addition to monthly programming from their NYC office, they broadcast regularly from London and Mexico City, and have broadcast offsite from Berlin, Brussels, Seoul, Hamburg, Sheffield, and Pasadena. Montez Press Radio has collaborated with arts institutions in New York and abroad, including The Queens Museum, MoMA PS1, The Kitchen, and The Geffen Contemporary at MOCA. Montez Press Radio is currently producing podcasts with Storefront for Arts and Architecture in a series called On the Ground: Broadcasts. In 2024, Montez Press Radio received a $90,000 grant from The Andy Warhol Foundation for the Visual Arts.

As of April 2026, board members for Montez Press Radio include Anna Clark (President), Jacques Louis-Vidal (Treasurer), Jeremy Toussaint-Baptiste (Secretary), Martha Fuller Clark, Than Clark, Rafael Foster, C. Spencer Yeh, and Galen Joseph-Hunter.

== Notable Segments ==
- Montez Got Talent: A semi-regular karaoke competition, hosted by Lena Greene, which sees "local weirdos, musicians, and art critics erupt into shouting matches about how karaoke should (or shouldn't) be judged."
- Tongue and Cheek: One of the longest running MPR segments, Tongue and Cheek is a live radio series of kinesthetic exercises, interviews and archival sound. T&C is made up of a group of New York-based visual artists and performative writers Aaron Lehman, Emma McCormick-Goodhart, and Tim Simonds.
- “Techno is everything you haven't imagined yet” : In 2024, Montez Press Radio hosted a panel featuring curator Guy Weltchek, DJs Juliana Huxtable and Russell E.L. Butler, McKenzie Wark, and TYGAPAW, in honor of the latter's debut solo exhibition, 3WI, at Art Omi.
