= Jorge Luis Rodriguez =

Puerto Rican mixed-media artist

Jorge Luis Rodriguez is an NYC-based American educator, painter, sculptor and mixed-media artist whose work has been featured in acclaimed museums and galleries across the city.

Born in Puerto Rico, Rodriguez came to New York City when he was 19 years old, to live with his father and brother, hoping to expand his technical training with a more experimental style. Rodriguez worked as a Junior Art Director before attending School of Visual Arts and New York University getting his bachelor's degree and Masters in Fine Arts respectively. Rodriguez then served as an art professor at CUNY from 1977 to 2003, as well as a sculpture teacher at School of Visual Arts from 1984 to 2003.

Rodriguez's style has evolved over the years, spanning op-art, abstraction, and figural representation, across two- and three-dimensional media. In the 1970s, he played an active role in the rising movement of installation art in New York City. Several of his sculptures were installed at Just Above Midtown (JAM), the interdisciplinary Black-led arts space founded by Linda Goode Bryant in 1974 exhibiting artists of color in a major gallery district. His first solo exhibition Círculos opened in 1976,

On the experience, Rodriguez has said:

The opportunity of showing my artwork alongside artists of different backgrounds taught me a very important lesson — not to have a frontier, a demarcation line, a perimeter. And when you intermingle and create installations with other artists, you learn different techniques and ways of expressing yourself alongside artists of different backgrounds. You grow as an artist when you join and participate and share possession of the final art installation.

Rodriguez' pieces "Vespers" (1975) and "Circle with Four Corners" (1978), along with other archival materials from his time at JAM, would be featured in the 2022 MoMA exhibition "Just Above Midtown: Changing Spaces" commemorating JAM and revisiting the late-20th-century art showed there. "Circle with Four Corners" would also be exhibited at Ki Smith Gallery in 2024 for the group exhibition "Routes of Our Paths" by Rodríguez with Marcos Dimas, Elsie Deliz, and James Reyes.

From JAM, Rodriguez began working with the Studio Museum in Harlem, another trailblazing Black-led institution where he was an artist-in-residence from 1980 to 1981. In 1982, the NYC Department of Cultural Affairs under Mayor Ed Koch developed a Percent for Art Program, and Rodriguez was the first artist to have a piece commissioned. His 14-foot high, steel painted sculpture "Growth" was installed in East Harlem Art Park in 1985 where it remains today.

The same year, Rodriguez collaborated with Harlem-born artist Charles Abramson on the exhibition "Orisha/Santos: An Artistic Interpretation of the Seven African Powers," exploring the iconographic syncretism between Yoruba deities and Catholic saints in the Santería religion through his steel figures and accompanying colorful altars. The piece was re-installed for the first time in 40 years at Ki Smith Gallery as part of Rodriguez's 2025 exhibition "Tales of the Unknown," along with other steel pieces and the plans for his new commission for the 116th street subway station viaduct. In December 2024, Rodriguez's "Musical Boxes" (1981) were included in the group show "Friend: A Survey of Op-Art and Minimalism" at Ki Smith Gallery in collaboration with Sentebale and Prince Harry, Duke of Sussex. They were exhibited alongside work by Tadaaki Kuwayama, Rakuko Naito, Richard Hambelton, and Frank Stella.

== Artworks & Installations ==
- "Circle with Four Corners" (1978, Just Above Midtown)
- "Art Across the Park" (1982, Central Park)
- "Growth" (1985-present, Harlem Art Park)
- "Orisha/Santos: An Artistic Interpretation of the Seven African Powers" (1985–2025, Museum of Contemporary Hispanic Arts, Ki Smith Gallery)
- "A Monument to 500 Years of the Cultural Reversal of America" (1990–1993, Mayfair Festival of the Arts, El Museo de Barrio)
- "The Tree of Knowledge" (1992, P.S.128M Washington Heights)
- "Oracle of the Past, Present, and Future" (1993–2016, Tompkins Square Park)
- "Atlas" (1999–2017, Marcus Garvey Acropolis)
- "Musical Boxes" (1981–2025, Ki Smith Gallery)
- "Universe" (2017, Atelier 212)
- "Just Above Midtown: Changing Spaces" (2022–2023, MoMA)
- "Tales of the Unknown" (2025, Ki Smith Gallery)
