= Washington D.C. Area Film Critics Association Award for Best Ensemble =

Annual US film award

The Washington D.C. Area Film Critics Association Award for Best Ensemble is one of the annual awards given by the Washington D.C. Area Film Critics Association. It is also known as the "Best Cast" award.

== Winners ==
=== 2000s ===
Year	Film	Ensemble
2002	Barbershop	Anthony Anderson, Cedric the Entertainer, Keith David, Michael Ealy, Eve, Troy Garity, Jazsmin Lewis, Sean Patrick Thomas
2002	My Big Fat Greek Wedding	Nia Vardalos, John Corbett, Lainie Kazan, Michael Constantine, Andrea Martin, Louis Mandylor, Gerry Mendicino, Joey Fatone, Gia Carides, Bess Meisler, Stavroula Logothettis, Ian Gomez, Bruce Gray, Fiona Reid, Jayne Eastwood, Kathryn Haggis, Peter Tharos, Maria Vacratsis
2003	Love Actually	Rowan Atkinson, Elisha Cuthbert, Chiwetel Ejiofor, Colin Firth, Gregor Fisher, Martin Freeman, Hugh Grant, Keira Knightley, Andrew Lincoln, Laura Linney, Lulu Popplewell, Martine McCutcheon, Liam Neeson, Bill Nighy, Alan Rickman, Emma Thompson
2003	The Lord of the Rings: The Return of the King	Elijah Wood, Ian McKellen, Viggo Mortensen, Sean Astin, Andy Serkis, Billy Boyd, Dominic Monaghan, John Rhys-Davies, Orlando Bloom, Bernard Hill, Miranda Otto, David Wenham, Karl Urban, Hugo Weaving, Liv Tyler, Cate Blanchett, John Noble, Ian Holm, Sean Bean, Marton Csokas, Lawrence Makoare, Thomas Robins
2003	Master and Commander: The Far Side of the World	Russell Crowe, Paul Bettany, James D'Arcy, Edward Woodall, Chris Larkin, Robert Pugh, Max Benitz, Max Pirkis, Lee Ingleby, Richard McCabe, Ian Mercer, Tony Dolan, David Threlfall, Billy Boyd, Bryan Dick, Joseph Morgan, George Innes, Patrick Gallagher, John DeSantis, Mark Lewis Jones
2003	A Mighty Wind	Catherine O'Hara, Eugene Levy, Harry Shearer, Michael McKean, Christopher Guest, Jane Lynch, John Michael Higgins, Parker Posey, Fred Willard, Bob Balaban, Jennifer Coolidge, Christopher Moynihan, Jim Piddock, Don Lake, Deborah Theaker, Ed Begley Jr., Michael Hitchcock, Larry Miller, Mark Nonisa, Patrick Sauber, Paul Dooley, Stuart Luce, Mary Gross, Marty Belafsky, Paul Benedict
2003	Mystic River	Sean Penn, Tim Robbins, Kevin Bacon, Laurence Fishburne, Marcia Gay Harden, Laura Linney, Tom Guiry, Spencer Treat Clark, Andrew Mackin, Emmy Rossum, Jenny O'Hara, Kevin Chapman, Adam Nelson, Robert Wahlberg, Cayden Boyd
2004	Eternal Sunshine of the Spotless Mind	Jane Adams, Jim Carrey, David Cross, Kirsten Dunst, Mark Ruffalo, Tom Wilkinson, Kate Winslet, Elijah Wood
2005	Crash	Don Cheadle, Sandra Bullock, Matt Dillon, Jennifer Esposito, Brendan Fraser, Terrence Howard, Ludacris, Thandiwe Newton, Michael Peña
2005	Good Night, and Good Luck	David Strathairn, Patricia Clarkson, George Clooney, Robert Downey Jr., Frank Langella, Jeff Daniels, Tate Donovan, Ray Wise, Helen Slayton-Hughes, Alex Borstein
2005	Pride & Prejudice	Claudie Blakley, Brenda Blethyn, Judi Dench, Tom Hollander, Rupert Friend, Keira Knightley, Matthew Macfadyen, Jena Malone, Carey Mulligan, Rosamund Pike, Kelly Reilly, Talulah Riley, Donald Sutherland
2005	Rent	Anthony Rapp, Adam Pascal, Rosario Dawson, Jesse L. Martin, Wilson Jermaine Heredia, Idina Menzel, Tracie Thoms, Taye Diggs
2005	Sin City	Bruce Willis, Mickey Rourke, Clive Owen, Jessica Alba, Rosario Dawson, Brittany Murphy, Josh Hartnett, Devon Aoki, Marley Shelton, Alexis Bledel, Nick Stahl, Jaime King, Michael Clarke Duncan, Michael Madsen, Powers Boothe, Jude Ciccolella, Benicio del Toro, Rick Gomez, Carla Gugino, Rutger Hauer, Nicky Katt, Clark Middleton, Nick Offerman, Scott Teeters, Patricia Vonne, Elijah Wood, Tommy Flanagan, Lisa Marie Newmyer
2006	Little Miss Sunshine	Alan Arkin, Abigail Breslin, Steve Carell, Toni Collette, Paul Dano, Greg Kinnear
2007	No Country for Old Men	Javier Bardem, Josh Brolin, Barry Corbin, Beth Grant, Woody Harrelson, Tess Harper, Tommy Lee Jones, Kelly Macdonald
2008	Doubt	Amy Adams, Viola Davis, Philip Seymour Hoffman, Meryl Streep
2009	The Hurt Locker	Christian Camargo, Ralph Fiennes, Brian Geraghty, Evangeline Lilly, Anthony Mackie, David Morse, Guy Pearce, Jeremy Renner
2009	Nine	Daniel Day-Lewis, Marion Cotillard, Penélope Cruz, Nicole Kidman, Judi Dench, Kate Hudson, Sophia Loren, Fergie, Ricky Tognazzi, Giuseppe Cederna, Elio Germano, Valerio Mastandrea, Martina Stella, Roberto Citran
2009	Precious	Gabourey Sidibe, Lehman College, Mo'Nique, Paula Patton, Mariah Carey, Sherri Shepherd, Lenny Kravitz, Nealla Gordon, Stephanie Andujar, Chyna Layne
2009	Star Trek	Chris Pine, Zachary Quinto, Karl Urban, Zoe Saldaña, Simon Pegg, John Cho, Anton Yelchin, Eric Bana, Bruce Greenwood, Ben Cross, Winona Ryder, Clifton Collins Jr., Chris Hemsworth, Jennifer Morrison, Rachel Nichols, Faran Tahir, Deep Roy, Greg Ellis, Tyler Perry, Amanda Foreman, Spencer Daniels, Victor Garber
2009	Up in the Air	George Clooney, Vera Farmiga, Anna Kendrick, Jason Bateman, Amy Morton, Melanie Lynskey, Danny McBride, Zach Galifianakis, J. K. Simmons, Sam Elliott, Chris Lowell, Tamala Jones

=== 2010s ===
Year	Film	Ensemble
2010	The Town	Ben Affleck, Chris Cooper, Rebecca Hall, Jon Hamm, Blake Lively, Pete Postlethwaite, Jeremy Renner, Slaine, Titus Welliver
2010	The Fighter	Mark Wahlberg, Christian Bale, Amy Adams, Melissa Leo, Jack McGee, Frank Renzulli, Jenna Lamia, Bianca Hunter, Erica McDermott, Alison Folland
2010	Inception	Leonardo DiCaprio, Ken Watanabe, Joseph Gordon-Levitt, Marion Cotillard, Elliot Page, Tom Hardy, Cillian Murphy, Tom Berenger, Michael Caine, Dileep Rao, Lukas Haas, Talulah Riley, Pete Postlethwaite
2010	The Kids Are All Right	Annette Bening, Julianne Moore, Mark Ruffalo, Mia Wasikowska, Josh Hutcherson, Yaya DaCosta, Eddie Hassell, Zosia Mamet, Kunal Sharma, James Macdonald
2010	The Social Network	Jesse Eisenberg, Andrew Garfield, Justin Timberlake, Armie Hammer, Max Minghella, Brenda Song, Rashida Jones, John Getz, David Selby, Denise Grayson, Douglas Urbanski, Rooney Mara, Joseph Mazzello, Dustin Fitzsimons, Wallace Langham, Patrick Mapel, Dakota Johnson, Malese Jow
2011	Bridesmaids	Rose Byrne, Jill Clayburgh, Ellie Kemper, Matt Lucas, Melissa McCarthy, Wendi McLendon-Covey, Chris O'Dowd, Maya Rudolph, Kristen Wiig, Rebel Wilson
2011	Harry Potter and the Deathly Hallows - Part 2	Daniel Radcliffe, Rupert Grint, Emma Watson, Robbie Coltrane, Warwick Davis, Michael Gambon, John Hurt, Jason Isaacs, Helen McCrory, Gary Oldman, Alan Rickman, Maggie Smith, David Thewlis, Julie Walters, Tom Felton, Bonnie Wright, Matthew Lewis, Evanna Lynch, Helena Bonham Carter, Ralph Fiennes
2011	The Help	Viola Davis, Emma Stone, Bryce Dallas Howard, Octavia Spencer, Jessica Chastain, Allison Janney, Chris Lowell, Ahna O'Reilly, Sissy Spacek, Mary Steenburgen, Cicely Tyson, Mike Vogel
2011	Hugo	Ben Kingsley, Sacha Baron Cohen, Asa Butterfield, Chloë Grace Moretz, Ray Winstone, Emily Mortimer, Jude Law, Helen McCrory, Michael Stuhlbarg, Gulliver McGrath, Christopher Lee, Frances de la Tour, Richard Griffiths
2011	Margin Call	Kevin Spacey, Paul Bettany, Jeremy Irons, Zachary Quinto, Penn Badgley, Simon Baker, Mary McDonnell, Demi Moore, Stanley Tucci, Aasif Mandvi, Ashley Williams, Susan Blackwell, Maria Dizzia
2012	Les Misérables	Samantha Barks, Sacha Baron Cohen, Helena Bonham Carter, Russell Crowe, Anne Hathaway, Hugh Jackman, Eddie Redmayne, Amanda Seyfried, Aaron Tveit, Colm Wilkinson
2012	Argo	Ben Affleck, Bryan Cranston, Alan Arkin, John Goodman, Victor Garber, Tate Donovan, Clea DuVall, Scoot McNairy, Rory Cochrane, Christopher Denham, Kerry Bishé, Kyle Chandler, Chris Messina, Željko Ivanek, Titus Welliver, Keith Szarabajka, Philip Baker Hall, Bob Gunton
2012	Lincoln	Daniel Day-Lewis, Sally Field, David Strathairn, Joseph Gordon-Levitt, James Spader, Hal Holbrook, Tommy Lee Jones, John Hawkes
2012	Moonrise Kingdom	Bruce Willis, Edward Norton, Bill Murray, Frances McDormand, Tilda Swinton, Jason Schwartzman, Bob Balaban, Jared Gilman, Kara Hayward, Lucas Hedges, Charlie Kilgore, Andreas Sheikh, Chandler Frantz, Robert Hadlock
2012	Zero Dark Thirty	Jessica Chastain, Jason Clarke, Jennifer Ehle, Joel Edgerton, Chris Pratt, Mark Strong, Kyle Chandler, James Gandolfini, Harold Perrineau, Callan Mulvey, Taylor Kinney, Mike Colter, Stephen Dillane
2013	12 Years a Slave	Benedict Cumberbatch, Paul Dano, Garret Dillahunt, Chiwetel Ejiofor, Michael Fassbender, Paul Giamatti, Taran Killam, Scoot McNairy, Lupita Nyong'o, Adepero Oduye, Sarah Paulson, Brad Pitt, Michael Kenneth Williams, Alfre Woodard
2013	American Hustle	Christian Bale, Bradley Cooper, Amy Adams, Jeremy Renner, Jennifer Lawrence, Louis C.K., Jack Huston, Michael Peña, Shea Whigham
2013	August: Osage County	Meryl Streep, Julia Roberts, Ewan McGregor, Chris Cooper, Abigail Breslin, Benedict Cumberbatch, Juliette Lewis, Margo Martindale, Dermot Mulroney, Julianne Nicholson, Sam Shepard, Misty Upham
2013	Prisoners	Hugh Jackman, Jake Gyllenhaal, Viola Davis, Maria Bello, Terrence Howard, Melissa Leo, Paul Dano, Dylan Minnette, Zoë Soul
2013	The Way, Way Back	Liam James, Steve Carell, Toni Collette, Sam Rockwell, Allison Janney, AnnaSophia Robb, Maya Rudolph, Rob Corddry
2014	Birdman or (The Unexpected Virtue of Ignorance)	Lindsay Duncan, Zach Galifianakis, Benjamin Kanes, Michael Keaton, Edward Norton, Andrea Riseborough, Amy Ryan, Jeremy Shamos, Emma Stone, Naomi Watts, Merritt Wever
2014	Boyhood	Ellar Coltrane, Patricia Arquette, Ethan Hawke, Lorelei Linklater, Libby Villari, Marco Perella, Brad Hawkins
2014	The Grand Budapest Hotel	Ralph Fiennes, Tony Revolori, Adrien Brody, Willem Dafoe, Saoirse Ronan, Tilda Swinton, Edward Norton, Mathieu Amalric, Jeff Goldblum, Harvey Keitel, Tom Wilkinson, Jude Law, Bill Murray, Jason Schwartzman, Owen Wilson, Léa Seydoux
2014	Into the Woods	Meryl Streep, Emily Blunt, James Corden, Anna Kendrick, Chris Pine, Johnny Depp, Lilla Crawford, Daniel Huttlestone, Billy Magnussen, MacKenzie Mauzy, Tracey Ullman, Christine Baranski
2014	Selma	David Oyelowo, Tom Wilkinson, Carmen Ejogo, André Holland, Giovanni Ribisi, Lorraine Toussaint, Stephan James, Wendell Pierce
2015	Spotlight	Billy Crudup, Brian d'Arcy James, Michael Keaton, Rachel McAdams, Mark Ruffalo, Liev Schreiber, John Slattery, Stanley Tucci
2015	The Big Short	Christian Bale, Steve Carell, Ryan Gosling, Brad Pitt, John Magaro, Finn Wittrock, Hamish Linklater, Rafe Spall, Jeremy Strong, Marisa Tomei, Tracy Letts
2015	The Hateful Eight	Samuel L. Jackson, Kurt Russell, Jennifer Jason Leigh, Walton Goggins, Demián Bichir, Tim Roth, Michael Madsen, Bruce Dern
2015	Steve Jobs	Michael Fassbender, Kate Winslet, Seth Rogen, Jeff Daniels, Katherine Waterston, Michael Stuhlbarg, Sarah Snook, Adam Shapiro, John Ortiz, Makenzie Moss, Ripley Sobo, Perla Haney-Jardine
2015	Straight Outta Compton	O'Shea Jackson Jr., Corey Hawkins, Jason Mitchell, Neil Brown Jr., Aldis Hodge, Paul Giamatti, Marlon Yates Jr., R. Marcos Taylor, LaKeith Stanfield, Alexandra Shipp, Corey Reynolds, Tate Ellington, Sheldon A. Smith, Carra Patterson, Elena Goode, Keith Powers
2016	Hell or High Water	Gil Birmingham, Jeff Bridges, Dale Dickey, Ben Foster, Marin Ireland, Katy Mixon, Melanie Papalia, Chris Pine, Kevin Rankin
2016	20th Century Women	Annette Bening, Elle Fanning, Greta Gerwig, Billy Crudup, Lucas Jade Zumann, Alison Elliott, Thea Gill
2016	Fences	Denzel Washington, Viola Davis, Stephen McKinley Henderson, Jovan Adepo, Russell Hornsby, Mykelti Williamson, Saniyya Sidney
2016	Manchester by the Sea	Casey Affleck, Lucas Hedges, Michelle Williams, Kyle Chandler, C. J. Wilson, Tate Donovan, Kara Hayward, Anna Baryshnikov, Heather Burns, Gretchen Mol, Matthew Broderick
2016	Moonlight	Trevante Rhodes, Ashton Sanders, Alex Hibbert, André Holland, Jharrel Jerome, Jaden Piner, Janelle Monáe, Naomie Harris, Mahershala Ali, Patrick Decile
2017	Three Billboards Outside Ebbing, Missouri	Darrell Britt-Gibson, Kerry Condon, Abbie Cornish, Peter Dinklage, Woody Harrelson, John Hawkes, Lucas Hedges, Željko Ivanek, Caleb Landry Jones, Frances McDormand, Kathryn Newton, Clarke Peters, Sam Rockwell, Samara Weaving
2017	Dunkirk	Fionn Whitehead, Tom Glynn-Carney, Jack Lowden, Harry Styles, Aneurin Barnard, James D’Arcy, Barry Keoghan, Kenneth Branagh, Cillian Murphy, Mark Rylance, Tom Hardy
2017	It	Jaeden Lieberher, Bill Skarsgård, Wyatt Oleff, Jeremy Ray Taylor, Sophia Lillis, Finn Wolfhard, Jack Dylan Grazer, Chosen Jacobs, Nicholas Hamilton, Jackson Robert Scott
2017	Mudbound	Carey Mulligan, Garrett Hedlund, Jason Clarke, Jason Mitchell, Mary J. Blige, Jonathan Banks, Rob Morgan
2017	The Post	Meryl Streep, Tom Hanks, Sarah Paulson, Bob Odenkirk, Tracy Letts, Bradley Whitford, Bruce Greenwood, Carrie Coon, Matthew Rhys
2018	The Favourite	Olivia Colman, Emma Stone, Rachel Weisz, Joe Alwyn, Nicholas Hoult
2018	Black Panther	Chadwick Boseman, Michael B. Jordan, Lupita Nyong'o, Danai Gurira, Martin Freeman, Daniel Kaluuya, Letitia Wright, Winston Duke, Sterling K. Brown, Angela Bassett, Forest Whitaker, Andy Serkis
2018	If Beale Street Could Talk	KiKi Layne, Stephan James, Regina King, Teyonah Parris, Colman Domingo, Brian Tyree Henry, Ed Skrein, Emily Rios, Michael Beach, Aunjanue Ellis, Ebony Obsidian, Dominique Thorne, Finn Wittrock, Diego Luna, Pedro Pascal, Dave Franco, Marcia Jean Kurtz
2018	Vice	Christian Bale, Amy Adams, Steve Carell, Sam Rockwell, Tyler Perry, Alison Pill, Lily Rabe, Jesse Plemons
2018	Widows	Viola Davis, Michelle Rodriguez, Elizabeth Debicki, Cynthia Erivo, Colin Farrell, Brian Tyree Henry, Daniel Kaluuya, Jacki Weaver, Carrie Coon
2019	Knives Out	Ana de Armas, Toni Collette, Daniel Craig, Jamie Lee Curtis, Chris Evans, Don Johnson, Katherine Langford, Riki Lindhome, Jaeden Martell, Edi Patterson, Christopher Plummer, Noah Segan, Michael Shannon, Lakeith Stanfield
2019	The Irishman	Robert De Niro, Al Pacino, Joe Pesci, Ray Romano, Bobby Cannavale, Anna Paquin, Stephen Graham, Harvey Keitel, Stephanie Kurtzuba, Kathrine Narducci, Welker White
2019	Little Women	Saoirse Ronan, Emma Watson, Florence Pugh, Eliza Scanlen, Laura Dern, Timothée Chalamet, Meryl Streep
2019	Once Upon a Time in Hollywood	Leonardo DiCaprio, Brad Pitt, Margot Robbie, Emile Hirsch, Margaret Qualley, Timothy Olyphant, Julia Butters, Austin Butler, Dakota Fanning, Bruce Dern, Mike Moh, Luke Perry, Damian Lewis
2019	Parasite	Song Kang-ho, Lee Sun-kyun, Cho Yeo-jeong, Choi Woo-shik, Park So-dam, Jang Hye-jin, Lee Jung-eun, Park Myung-hoon, Jung Ji-so, Jung Hyeon-jun

=== 2020s ===
Year	Film	Ensemble
2020	One Night in Miami...	Kingsley Ben-Adir, Eli Goree, Aldis Hodge, Leslie Odom, Jr.
2020	Da 5 Bloods	Delroy Lindo, Jonathan Majors, Clarke Peters, Norm Lewis, Isiah Whitlock Jr., Johnny Trí Nguyễn, Mélanie Thierry, Paul Walter Hauser, Jasper Pääkkönen, Chadwick Boseman, Veronica Ngo, Jean Reno, Lê Y Lan, Nguyễn Ngọc Lâm, Sandy Hương Phạm
2020	Ma Rainey's Black Bottom	Viola Davis, Chadwick Boseman, Glynn Turman, Colman Domingo, Michael Potts, Jonny Coyne, Taylour Paige, Jeremy Shamos, Dusan Brown
2020	Minari	Steven Yeun, Han Ye-ri, Alan Kim, Noel Kate Cho, Youn Yuh-jung, Will Patton, Scott Haze, Jacob Wade
2020	The Trial of the Chicago 7	Eddie Redmayne, Sacha Baron Cohen, Alex Sharp, Jeremy Strong, John Carroll Lynch, Noah Robbins, Daniel Flaherty, Yahya Abdul-Mateen II, Mark Rylance, Joseph Gordon-Levitt, Ben Shenkman, J. C. MacKenzie, Frank Langella, Kelvin Harrison Jr., Michael Keaton, John Doman, Wayne Duvall, Caitlin FitzGerald, Max Adler, Damian Young
2021	Mass	Reed Birney, Ann Dowd, Jason Isaacs, Martha Plimpton, Breeda Wool, Kagen Albright, Michelle N. Carter
2021	Belfast	Jude Hill, Caitríona Balfe, Jamie Dornan, Judi Dench, Ciarán Hinds, Lewis McAskie, Colin Morgan, Lara McDonnell, Michael Maloney
2021	The French Dispatch	Owen Wilson, Benicio del Toro, Adrien Brody, Tilda Swinton, Léa Seydoux, Frances McDormand, Timothée Chalamet, Lyna Khoudri, Jeffrey Wright, Liev Schreiber, Mathieu Amalric, Stephen Park, Bill Murray, Elisabeth Moss, Jason Schwartzman
2021	The Harder They Fall	Jonathan Majors, Idris Elba, Zazie Beetz, Regina King, Delroy Lindo, Lakeith Stanfield, RJ Cyler, Danielle Deadwyler, Edi Gathegi, Deon Cole, Damon Wayans Jr., DeWanda Wise, Michael Beach, Julio Cesar Cedillo, Mark "Rhino" Smith
2021	The Power of the Dog	Benedict Cumberbatch, Kirsten Dunst, Jesse Plemons, Kodi Smit-McPhee, Thomasin McKenzie, Genevieve Lemon, Keith Carradine, Frances Conroy, Peter Carroll, Alison Bruce
2022	Glass Onion: A Knives Out Mystery	Daniel Craig, Edward Norton, Janelle Monáe, Kathryn Hahn, Leslie Odom Jr., Kate Hudson, Dave Bautista, Jessica Henwick, Madelyn Cline, Noah Segan, Jackie Hoffman, Dallas Roberts
2022	The Banshees of Inisherin	Colin Farrell, Brendan Gleeson, Kerry Condon, Barry Keoghan, Gary Lydon
2022	Everything Everywhere All At Once	Michelle Yeoh, Stephanie Hsu, Ke Huy Quan, James Hong, Jamie Lee Curtis, Tallie Medel, Jenny Slate, Harry Shum Jr.
2022	The Fabelmans	Michelle Williams, Paul Dano, Seth Rogen, Gabriel LaBelle, Keeley Karsten, Julia Butters, Judd Hirsch, Sophia Kopera
2022	Women Talking	Rooney Mara, Claire Foy, Jessie Buckley, Judith Ivey, Sheila McCarthy, Michelle McLeod, Kate Hallett, Liv McNeil
2023	Oppenheimer	Cillian Murphy, Emily Blunt, Matt Damon, Robert Downey Jr., Florence Pugh, Josh Hartnett, Casey Affleck, Rami Malek, Kenneth Branagh, Benny Safdie, Jason Clarke, Dylan Arnold
2023	American Fiction	Jeffrey Wright, Tracee Ellis Ross, Issa Rae, Sterling K. Brown, John Ortiz, Erika Alexander, Leslie Uggams, Adam Brody, Keith David, Okieriete Onaodowan, Myra Lucretia Taylor
2023	Barbie	Margot Robbie, Ryan Gosling, Simu Liu, America Ferrera, Ariana Greenblatt, Rhea Perlman, Helen Mirren, Will Ferrell, Michael Cera
2023	Killers of the Flower Moon	Leonardo DiCaprio, Robert De Niro, Lily Gladstone, Jesse Plemons, Tantoo Cardinal, John Lithgow, Brendan Fraser, Cara Jade Myers
2023	The Holdovers	Paul Giamatti, Dominic Sessa, Da'Vine Joy Randolph, Carrie Preston
2024	Conclave	Ralph Fiennes, Stanley Tucci, John Lithgow, Lucian Msamati, Brían F. O'Byrne, Carlos Diehz, Merab Ninidze, Thomas Loibl, Sergio Castellitto, Isabella Rossellini, Jacek Koman
2024	Anora	Mikey Madison, Mark Eydelshteyn, Yura Borisov, Karren Karagulian, Vache Tovmasyan, Aleksei Serebryakov, Darya Ekamasova, Lindsey Normington, Anton Bitter, Ivy Wolk
2024	Dune: Part Two	Timothée Chalamet, Zendaya, Rebecca Ferguson, Josh Brolin, Austin Butler, Florence Pugh, Dave Bautista, Christopher Walken, Léa Seydoux, Souheila Yacoub, Stellan Skarsgård, Charlotte Rampling, Javier Bardem
2024	Sing Sing	Colman Domingo, Clarence "Divine Eye" Maclin, Sean San José, Paul Raci, Johnny Simmons, Sharon Washington
2024	The Brutalist	Adrien Brody, Felicity Jones, Guy Pearce, Joe Alwyn, Raffey Cassidy, Stacy Martin, Alessandro Nivola, Emma Laird, Isaach de Bankolé
2024	Wicked	Cynthia Erivo, Ariana Grande, Jonathan Bailey, Ethan Slater, Bowen Yang, Peter Dinklage, Michelle Yeoh, Jeff Goldblum, Marissa Bode, Bronwyn James

== See also ==
- Independent Spirit Robert Altman Award
- Screen Actors Guild Award for Outstanding Performance by a Cast in a Motion Picture
