= Beverly Theater (Las Vegas, Nevada) =

Independent movie theater in Las Vegas, Nevada

The Beverly Theater
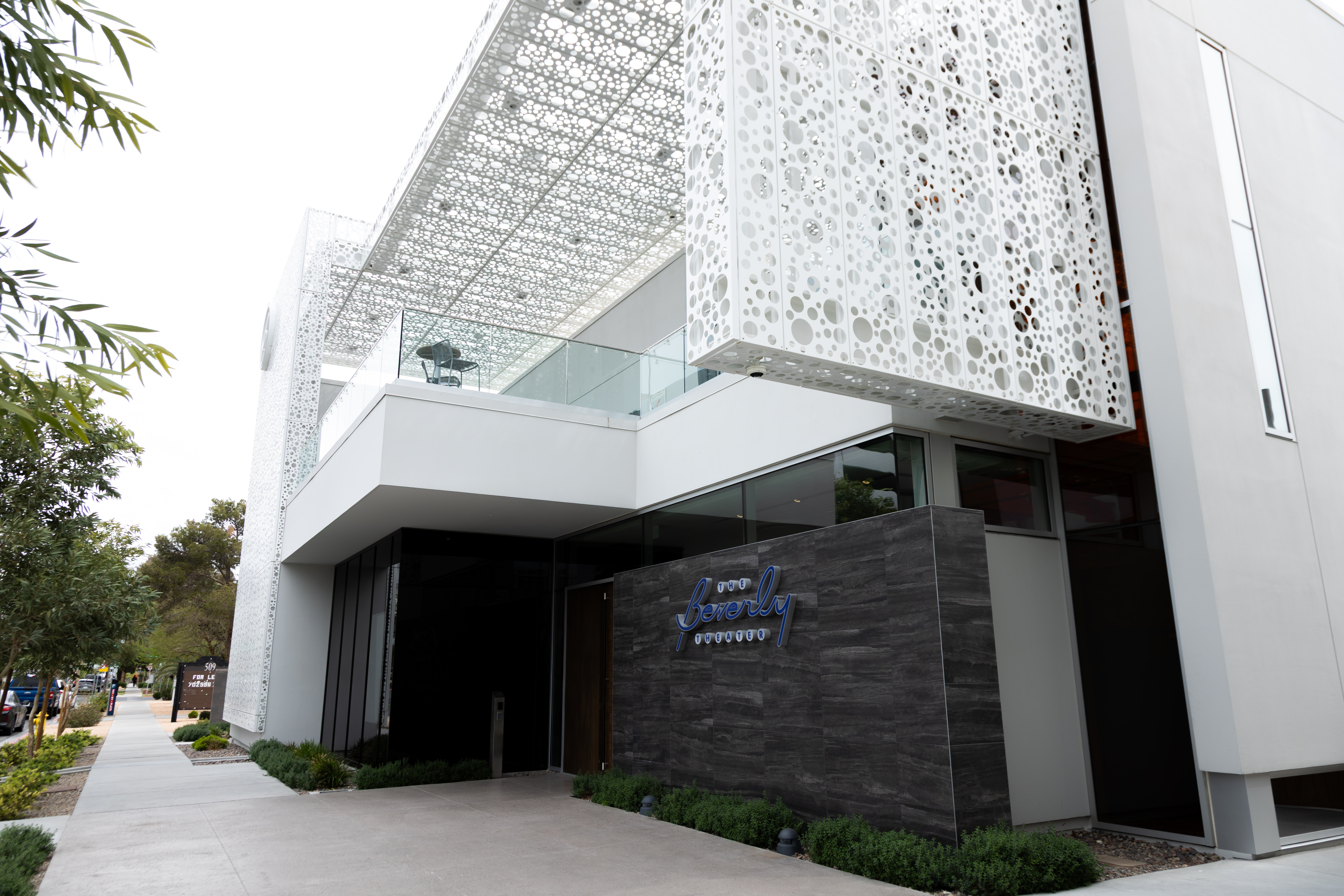
- Outside view of The Beverly Theater
- Interactive map of the The Beverly Theater area

General information
- Location: 515 South Sixth Street; Las Vegas, NV 89101, United States
- Coordinates: 36.163675°N 115.142733°W
- Year built: 2021–2023
- Groundbreaking: October 29, 2021
- Opened: March 3, 2023

The Beverly Theater is an independent movie theater in Las Vegas, Nevada. Established in 2023 and named after the philanthropist Beverly Rogers, it was Las Vegas' first indie theater; as of 2025, it remains the city's only one. In addition to showing films, it also serves as a venue for performances and literary events.

In 2024, Las Vegas Weekly named The Beverly Theater for its 2024 Best of Vegas: Reader's Choice.

== History ==
In 2021, the Rogers Foundation unveiled plans to build a 14,000 square foot theater for film and performance in downtown Las Vegas on Sixth Street. "Groundtaking" happened in the same year.

Originally slated for a 2022 debut, the $30-million Beverly Theater opened on March 3, 2023 at 515 South Sixth Street with 146 seats. Its founding creative director, as well as chief experiences officer, is Kip Kelly. It was the first indie movie theater in Las Vegas and remains as such.

== Programming ==
The theater's programming is broadly split into three categories.

Lit (literature) programming, often done in partnership with the Black Mountain Institute, generally consists of author talks and readings. Past guests have included Teju Cole, Pemi Aguda, and others.

Live (live entertainment) programming involves live performances, as well as jazz shows. In April 2024, Julia Jacklin held residency at the theater.

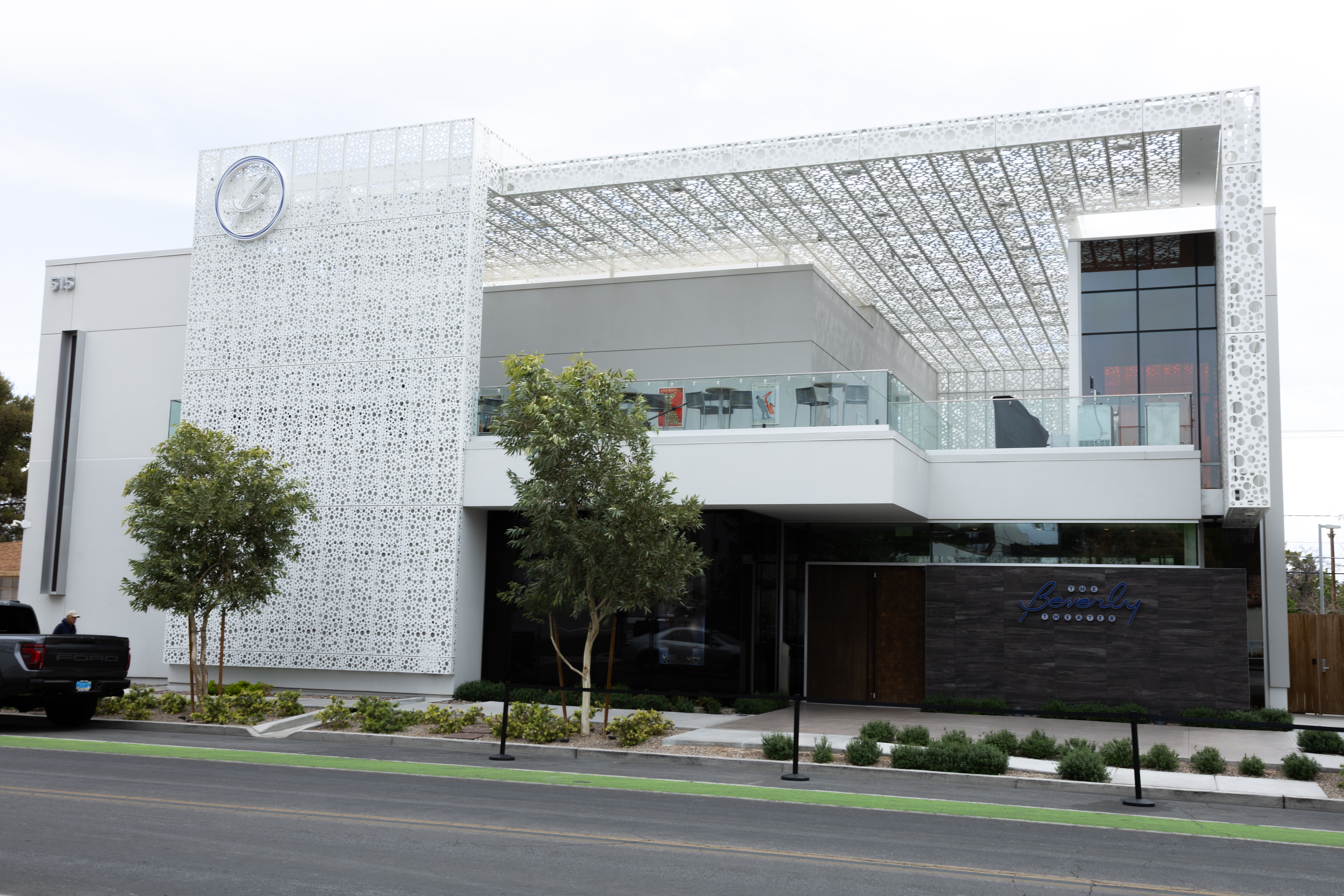
The Beverly Theater from the street side

Film (indie cinema) programming is the theater's primary duty, with regular screening of independent and art house films year-round. The theater has also served as a site for feature premieres and exclusive screenings. For several years, the theater has partnered with local nonprofit, Unshakeable, to host The Most Horrible Horror Movie Ever, a fundraiser and screening. On January 3, 2025, it held a VIP screening and red carpet for The Last Showgirl with Pamela Anderson in attendance. On March 25, 2025, it hosted the premiere of Shaken & Stirred.

== Ink Films ==
In March 2024, The Beverly Theater announced that it would be launching a film distribution company called Ink Films. Mike Plante was named as its head of distribution. The company's goal would be in lock step with the theater's by specifically focusing on and investing in underrepresented and independent movies.
