= Byline (magazine) =

American culture and style magazine

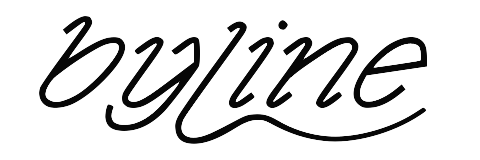
- Categories: Culture, fashion, media
- Frequency: Quarterly
- Founder: Michelle "Gutes" Guterman; Megan O'Sullivan
- First issue: 2023
- Country: United States
- Based in: New York City, New York, United States
- Language: English
- Website: bylinebyline.com

Byline is an American magazine focusing on culture, style, and media. Launched in 2023, the publication is primarily digital but also releases quarterly print editions.

== History ==
Byline was founded by Michelle "Gutes" Guterman and Megan O'Sullivan. Guterman co-created the COVID-19 pandemic-era print newspaper The Drunken Canal, which centered on Lower Manhattan gossip and commentary. She intended for Byline to be The Canal's "sequel, but not necessarily Part 2," with an emphasis on amplifying writers' personalities. The site launched in June 2023.

Early columnists included the journalist Taylor Lorenz and 12-year-old Henry Jones.

Byline attracted early criticism for describing itself as a "non-funded, for-fun project" and declaring that "contributors to Byline will be unpaid." Writer and actress Tajja Isen lamented that the publication's lack of compensation was part of a devaluation of writing and reinforcement of the barriers that limit access to the industry to people with financial means. Writer Yasmin Nair also criticized Byline as "an influence-generator ... run by two people who could, if they wanted to, call on massive resources and actually create, at the very least, a decent publication." The magazine began paying contributors in September 2023 after securing sponsorship agreements with Urban Outfitters and Dickies.

== Content ==
Byline's website includes a variety of elements intended to accentuate the publication's playful, off-beat tone, including tilted text, wobbling animations, and illustrated icons. Art director Madeline Montoya said she hoped her eclectic choices would convey that "something young and small doesn't need to have a specific look in every facet."

Each quarterly issue of Byline is organized around a theme; early topics have included "Hacking It," "FREAKING OUT!", and "The Beauty Issue."
