= Ki Smith Gallery =

Art gallery in New York City

Coordinates: 40.72415°N 73.98408°W

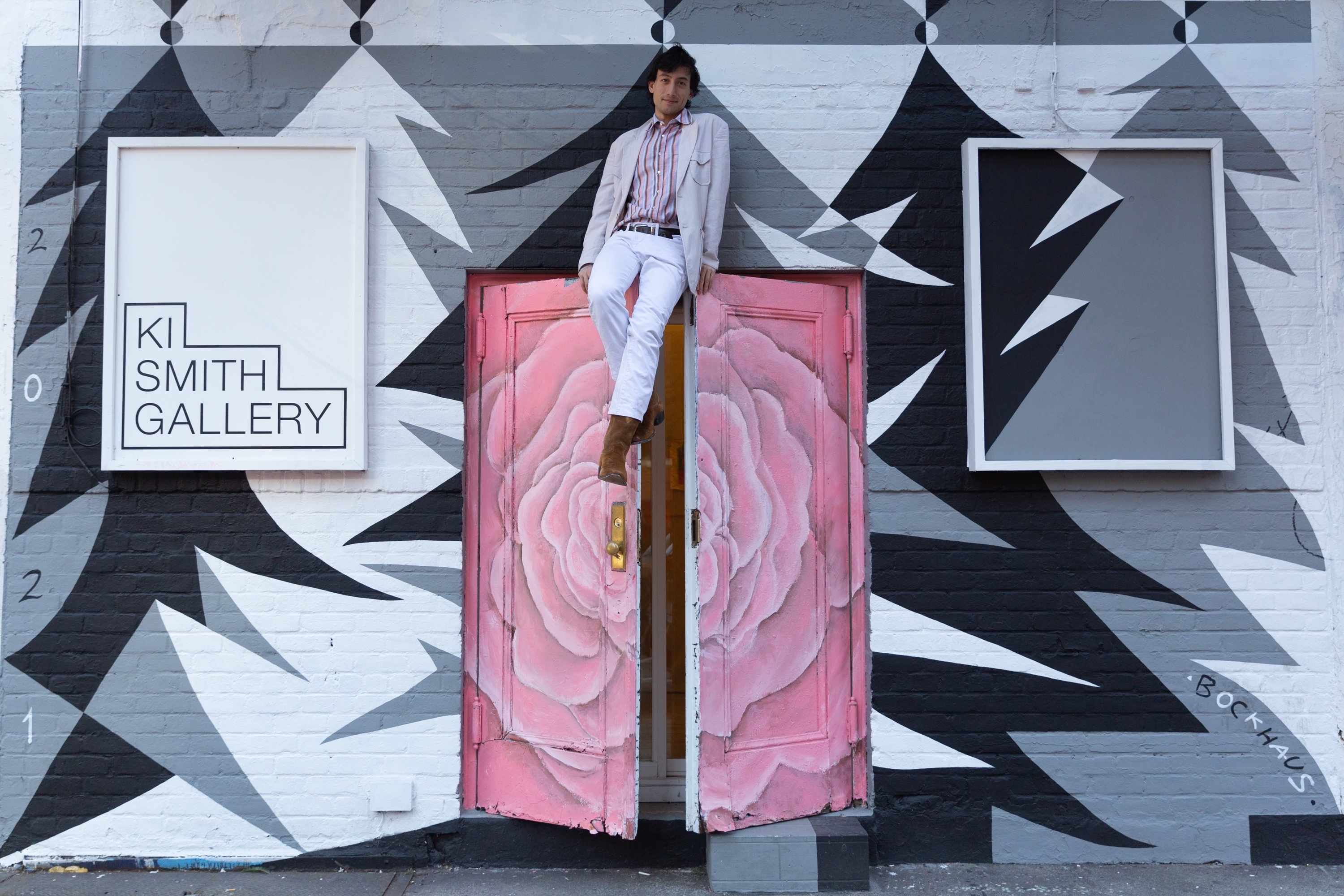
Ki Smith at Ki Smith Gallery (197 E 4th St)

Ki Smith Gallery is an art gallery on the Lower East Side of New York City. Founded in 2018 (8 years ago) by Ki Smith the gallery focuses on long lasting relationships with New York based artists, "drawing inspiration from dealers of the 1970s-like Richard Bellamy or Paula Cooper-who were often the same age or not much older than the artists they represented."

== History ==
Ki Smith opened Ki Smith Gallery in 2018 with an inaugural event in collaboration with Ryan Bock titled the Bock Brick Benefit. Many of the original artists working with Ki Smith Gallery were also associated with Smith's previous gallery and underground nightclub (Apostrophe NYC) which he ran from 2012 to 2018. The gallery was best known for its guerilla art exhibitions at the Whitney Museum, The Met Breuer, and MoMA PS1.

Ki Smith Gallery
- Founder: Ki Smith
- Headquarters: New York City, US
- Website: www.kismithgallery.com

In 2019, Smith opened Ki Smith Gallery's first brick and mortar location in an empty retail space at 712 W 125th Street in Harlem donated by David and Pernilla Avital of MTP Invest. For two years, they showcased represented artists and developed a publication program. Later in 2019, Ki Smith enlisted the rights coordinator of MoMA's publication department, Naomi Falk (also of Archway Editions) to help cofound Ki Smith Gallery's editorial department. Contributing writers for publications include Chris Molnar and Bob Holman. In 2020, the gallery moved downtown to 197 East 4th Street, and in 2021, it expanded to a second location at 311 E 3rd Street. In 2021 they collaborated with the Arte Laguna Prize as part of their "Artist in Gallery" special prize. In 2022, the gallery moved to the Lower East Side at 170 Forsyth Street, where it continues to build its program.

At its current location, Ki Smith Gallery worked with Gregory Pierce, director of film and video at the Andy Warhol Museum in Pittsburgh, to present a select series of screen tests titled "Poetry & Prose: Screen Tests by Andy Warhol" for the first time in a gallery setting, whose subjects would reflect the gallery's abiding downtown ethos. Following Poetry & Prose, on December 4, 2024 Ki Smith Gallery held an exhibition titled "Friend" supporting Duke of Sussex Prince Harry's former charity Sentebale. The display featured iconic works by Frank Stella (Blyvoors, 1982), Bridget Riley and Tadaaki Kuwayama, Smith's grandfather (whose selected works were displayed for the first time in 40 years.) The gallerist named the charitable exhibit after his late grandfather, who Smith and his siblings affectionately called "friend." The welcoming moniker for the exhibition was inspired by the spirit of friendship, a core theme for both the Lower East Side gallery and Sentebale's efforts. From March 8, 2025 through April 13, 2025, Ki Smith Gallery showcased an exhibition of artworks and photographs by artist and photographer Bobby Grossman featuring works by Shepard Fairey and John Holmstrom titled "Corn Flakes & More." In the show, oversize cereal box artworks were decorated with images of prominent figures such as Andy Warhol, Tina Weymouth, Stiv Bators, Jackie Curtis, Richard Hell, David Byrne, Debbie Harry, David Johansen, and Robert Fripp. Numerous photos by Bobby Grossman in the show featured other prominent figures including Jean-Michel Basquiat, Iggy Pop, David Bowie, Fab Five Freddy, and Joey Ramone among others. In July 2025, Ki Smith Gallery exhibited work by pioneering Puerto Rican painter and sculptor Jorge Luis Rodriguez in his solo show "Tales of the Unknown." The exhibition featured Rodriguez's historic and recent steel sculptures, such as the original maquette for his 1985 Percent for Art commission in Harlem Art Park "Growth," his plans for the upcoming renovation of the 116th street viaduct, and the installation "Orisha/Santos: An Artistic Interpretation of the Seven African Powers," which was displayed for the first time in 40 years since it was first exhibited at the Museum of Contemporary Hispanic Art.

== Artists ==
The gallery has exhibited artists including:

- Ryan Bock
- James Rubio
- Caslon Bevington
- Charlie Hudson
- Bruno Smith
- James Reyes
- Luke Ivy Price
- Andy Warhol
- The Love Child
- David Burnett
- Jill Freedman
- Angelica Yudasto
- Sono Kuwayama
- Kiyomi Quinn Taylor
- Ari Marcopoulos
- Jonas Mekas
- Michael Stipe
- Jorge Luis Rodríguez
- Marcos Dimas
- Elsie Deliz
- Bridget Riley
- Agnes Martin
- Frank Stella
- Richard Hambleton
- Tadaaki Kuwayama
- Rakuko Naito

== Performances at Ki Smith Gallery ==
At their current space on Forsyth Street, Ki Smith Gallery has a stage with a full PA and backline where they regularly host performances. Acts such as musicians, playwrights, poets, filmmakers, and more have shown their work in the lower-level performance space.
