= The Polysyllabic Spree =

2004 book by Nick Hornby

- First edition
- Author: Nick Hornby
- Publisher: McSweeney's
- Publication date: 2004
- ISBN: 1-932416-24-2
- Followed by: Housekeeping vs. The Dirt

The Polysyllabic Spree is a 2004 collection of Nick Hornby's "Stuff I've Been Reading" columns in The Believer. The book collates his columns from September 2003 to November 2004, inclusive. It also includes excerpts from such authors as Anton Chekhov and Charles Dickens.

In it, Hornby lists the books he bought each month, and the books he actually read. For instance, he might buy Dickens, but read J.D. Salinger. He then writes a column revolving around what he read, bought, and what he intends/intended to read.

The title is a reference to the choral symphonic-rock group The Polyphonic Spree. In the book, Hornby describes the people who run The Believer as being "all dressed in white robes and smiling maniacally, sort of like a literary equivalent of the Polyphonic Spree." (pg. 30)

There are three follow-up books, Housekeeping vs. The Dirt (2006), Shakespeare Wrote for Money (2008) and More Baths Less Talking (2012).

== List of books ==
=== September 2003 ===
Books bought:

- Robert Lowell: A Biography – Ian Hamilton
- Collected Poems – Robert Lowell
- Against Oblivion: Some of the Lives of the 20th-Century Poets – Ian Hamilton
- In Search of J. D. Salinger – Ian Hamilton
- Nine Stories – J. D. Salinger
- Franny and Zooey – J. D. Salinger
- Raise High the Roof Beam, Carpenters and Seymour: An Introduction – J. D. Salinger
- The Ern Malley Affair – Michael Heyward
- Something Happened – Joseph Heller
- Penguin Modern Poets 5 – Corso/Ferlinghetti/Ginsberg

Books read:

- All the Salingers
- In Search of Salinger and Lowell
- Some of Against Oblivion
- Pompeii by Robert Harris (not bought)

=== October 2003 ===
Books bought:

- A Tragic Honesty: The Life and Work of Richard Yates – Blake Bailey
- Notes on a Scandal – Zoë Heller (released in the US as "What Was She Thinking? Notes on a Scandal")

Books read:

- Being John McEnroe – Tim Adams
- Stop-Time – Frank Conroy
- The Fortress of Solitude – Jonathan Lethem
- Desperate Characters – Paula Fox
- Notes on a Scandal – Zoë Heller
- Where You’re At – Patrick Neate
- Feel Like Going Home – Peter Guralnick
- The People's Music – Ian MacDonald
- A Tragic Honesty – Blake Bailey (unfinished)
- How to Stop Smoking and Stay Stopped for Good – Gillian Riley
- Quitting Smoking – The Lazy Person's Guide! – Gillian Riley

=== November 2003 ===
Books bought:

- Bush at War – Bob Woodward
- Six Days of War – Michael B. Oren
- Genome – Matt Ridley
- Isaac Newton – James Gleick
- God’s Pocket – Pete Dexter
- The Poet and the Murderer – Simon Worrall
- Sputnik Sweetheart – Haruki Murakami
- Lie Down in Darkness – William Styron
- Leadville – Edward Platt
- Master Georgie – Beryl Bainbridge
- How to Breathe Underwater – Julie Orringer (two copies)

Books read:

- A Tragic Honesty: The Life and Work of Richard Yates – Blake Bailey (completed)
- Wenger: The Making of a Legend – Jasper Rees
- How to Breathe Underwater – Julie Orringer
- Bush at War – Bob Woodward (unfinished)
- Unnamed Literary Novel (abandoned)
- Unnamed Work of Nonfiction (abandoned)
- No Name – Wilkie Collins (unfinished)

=== December 2003/January 2004 ===
Books bought:

- Moneyball – Michael Lewis
- Saul and Patsy – Charles Baxter
- Winner of the National Book Award – Jincy Willett
- Jenny and the Jaws of Life – Jincy Willett
- The Sirens of Titan – Kurt Vonnegut
- True Notebooks – Mark Salzman

Books read:

- No Name – Wilkie Collins
- Moneyball – Michael Lewis
- George and Sam: Autism in the Family – Charlotte Moore
- The Sirens of Titan – Kurt Vonnegut

=== February 2004 ===
Books bought:

- Old School – Tobias Wolff
- Train – Pete Dexter
- Backroom Boys – Francis Spufford
- You Are Not a Stranger Here – Adam Haslett
- Eats, Shoots and Leaves – Lynn Truss

Books read:

- Enemies of Promise – Cyril Connolly
- What Just Happened? – Art Linson
- Clockers – Richard Price
- Eats, Shoots and Leaves – Lynn Truss
- Meat Is Murder – Joe Pernice
- Dusty in Memphis – Warren Zanes
- Old School – Tobias Wolff
- Introducing Time – Craig Callender and Ralph Edney
- PLUS: a couple of stories in You Are Not a Stranger Here; a couple of stories in Sixty Stories by Donald Barthelme; a couple of stories in Here's Your Hat What's Your Hurry by Elizabeth McCracken.

=== March 2004 ===
Books bought:

- The Amateur Marriage – Anne Tyler
- The Eclipse – Antonella Gambotto
- The Complete Richard Hannay – John Buchan
- Selected Letters – Gustave Flaubert
- Vietnam-Perkasie – W. D. Ehrhart

Books read:

- Some of Flaubert's letters
- Not Even Wrong – Paul Collins
- How Mumbo-Jumbo Conquered the World – Francis Wheen
- Liar's Poker – Michael Lewis
- Some of Greenmantle – John Buchan
- How to Give Up Smoking and Stay Stopped for Good – Gillian Riley

=== April 2004 ===
Books bought:

- Hangover Square – Patrick Hamilton
- The Long Firm – Jake Arnott
- American Sucker – David Denby

Books read:

- Hangover Square – Patrick Hamilton
- The Long Firm – Jake Arnott
- The Curious Incident of the Dog in the Night-Time – Mark Haddon
- True Notebooks – Mark Salzman

=== May 2004 ===
Books bought:

- Random Family: Love, Drugs, Trouble, and Coming of Age in the Bronx – Adrian Nicole LeBlanc
- What Narcissism Means to Me – Tony Hoagland
- David Copperfield – Charles Dickens (twice)

Books read:

- David Copperfield – Charles Dickens

=== June 2004 ===
Books bought:

- Donkey Gospel – Tony Hoagland
- I Never Liked You – Chester Brown
- We Need to Talk About Kevin – Lionel Shriver

Books read:

- Random Family – Adrian Nicole LeBlanc
- What Narcissism Means to Me – Tony Hoagland
- Bobby Fischer Goes to War – David Edmonds and John Eidinow

=== July 2004 ===
Books bought[¹]:

- The Invisible Woman – Claire Tomalin
- Y: The Last Man Vols 1–3 – Vaughan, Guerra, Marzan Jr., Chadwick
- I Never Liked You – Chester Brown
- David Boring – Daniel Clowes
- The Amazing Adventures of The Escapist – Michael Chabon et al.
- Safe Area Goražde – Joe Sacco
- Not Entitled – Frank Kermode

[¹] The author here inserts a footnote: "I bought so many books this month it’s obscene, and I’m not owning up to them all: this is a selection. And to be honest, I’ve been economical with the truth for months now. I keep finding books that I bought, didn’t read, and didn’t list."

Books read:

- Train – Pete Dexter
- This Is Serbia Calling – Matthew Collin
- The Invisible Woman – Claire Tomalin
- Y: The Last Man Vols 1–3 – Vaughan, Guerra, Marzan Jr., Chadwick
- I Never Liked You – Chester Brown
- David Boring – Daniel Clowes

=== August 2004 ===
Books bought:

- Prayers for Rain – Dennis Lehane
- Mystic River – Dennis Lehane
- Jesse James: Last Rebel of the Civil War – T. J. Stiles
- The Line of Beauty – Alan Hollinghurst
- Like a Fiery Elephant – Jonathan Coe

Books read:

- Prayers for Rain – Dennis Lehane
- Mystic River – Dennis Lehane
- Like a Fiery Elephant – Jonathan Coe
