= Nell Theobald =

American actress (1944–1977)

Theobald poses with Ludwig the lion moments before being attacked

Nell Theobald (October 5, 1944 – August 20, 1977) was an American model, actress and dancer from Atlanta, Georgia.

Theobald initially gained fame at age 21 after she was attacked by a lion during a BMW photo shoot at the New York International Auto Show at the New York Coliseum on April 9, 1966. At first the lion named Ludwig was calm in posing with the model, but when he was later pulled out of its cage, apparently aggravated by his trainer, he bit Theobald in the left thigh. She was taken to Roosevelt Hospital and underwent surgery to save her leg from being amputated. A spokesman for the International Automobile Show stated no live animals were supposed to take part, but the show had no control over separate promotion for the event by automobile companies previewing their cars. Theobald initially sought $3 million in a lawsuit against the International Automobile Show, Grey Public Relations, Dawn Animal Agency, Coliseum Exhibition Corporation and Hoffman Motor Corporation, but received $250,000 in a settlement in 1971.

She later drew notoriety for obsessively stalking opera singer Birgit Nilsson for nine years, beginning at the summer of 1968 at the Bayreuth Festival and ending upon Theobald's suicide in 1977. Theobald sent her daily flowers and followed her around the globe. Nilsson did not know Theobald's identity, only knowing her as Miss N, until 1971, when she read an article about the lawsuit settlement and saw her photo. Following her settlement, Theobald's obsessive behavior with Nilsson only intensified because she had more money to travel and send gifts. Nilsson recounted her experiences with Theobald at length in her memoir La Nilsson, published in 2005.

As an actress, she appeared on the New York stage, in television commercials, and made some minor appearances in films and television shows. She died by suicide on August 20, 1977 in New York City.

The 2027 novel Heaven's Oblivion by Chris Molnar concerns the relationship between Nilsson and Theobald.
