= Witness (magazine) =

- Discipline: Literature, poetry, fiction, nonfiction, social issues, culture, international affairs, photography
- Language: English
- Edited by: Areej Quraishi

Publication details
- History: 1987-present
- Publisher: Black Mountain Institute; University of Nevada, Las Vegas (United States)
- Frequency: Triannual

Standard abbreviations
- ISO 4: Witness

Indexing
- ISSN: 0891-1371

Links
- Journal homepage

Witness is a literary and issue-oriented magazine published by the Black Mountain Institute at UNLV. Each issue includes fiction, poetry, memoir, and literary essays. The magazine has been honored with ten grants from the National Endowment for the Arts, and writings from the journal have been recognized in The Best American Essays, The O. Henry Prize Stories, The Best American Poetry, and The Pushcart Prize.

Launched in Detroit in 1987, Witness has published 43 issues, twenty of them focused on topics of contemporary interest. The magazine is best known for showcasing work that defines its historical moment. Special issues have focused on political oppression, religion, the natural world, crime, aging, civil rights, love, ethnic America, and, most recently, exile. The issues "New Nature Writing," "The Sixties," "Sports in America," and "The Best of Witness, 1987 - 2004" eventually appeared as university press anthologies. In 2007, Witness moved from Oakland Community College to Black Mountain Institute at the University of Nevada, Las Vegas.

== See also ==
- List of literary magazines
