= Shakespeare Wrote for Money =

- First edition
- Author: Nick Hornby
- Publisher: McSweeney's
- Publication date: 2008
- ISBN: 978-1-934781-29-6
- Preceded by: Housekeeping vs. The Dirt
- Followed by: More Baths Less Talking

Shakespeare Wrote for Money is a 2008 collection of English author Nick Hornby's "Stuff I've Been Reading" columns for The Believer. It contains columns written from August 2006 to September 2008, Hornby's "Stuff I've Been Reading Column." The introduction is written by American author Sarah Vowell.

Previous collections of Hornby's "Stuff I've Been Reading Column" were collected in The Polysyllabic Spree (2004) and Housekeeping vs. The Dirt (2006).
