= Housekeeping vs. The Dirt =

2006 collection of essays by Nick Hornby

- First edition
- Author: Nick Hornby
- Publisher: McSweeney's
- Publication date: 2006
- ISBN: 978-1932416596
- Preceded by: The Polysyllabic Spree
- Followed by: Shakespeare Wrote for Money

Housekeeping vs. The Dirt is a 2006 collection of essays from The Believer written by Nick Hornby. It follows on from another collection of columns from the same magazine entitled The Polysyllabic Spree.
