= Jacques Louis Vidal =

Contemporary artist & sculptor based in Brooklyn

Jacques Louis Vidal (born 1982) is an American artist based in Brooklyn, New York. He attended the School of the Museum of Fine Arts, Boston, graduating in 2004, and received his MFA from Yale in 2009.

Working across collage, performance, installation, and sculpture Vidal has developed a multi-medium experimental practice that incorporates internet culture, graffiti, mail-art, hand-carved wood, 3D printing, found and fabricated materials, and, more recently, drawings reworked through generative AI image tools.

His exhibitions have been conceived as immersive, architectural environments: his 2009 solo You Are What You Look At at Marc Jancou Contemporary in New York presented collages, sculptures and architectural fragments organized around what the gallery described as "isolation klosets," and his 2011 follow-up Games People Play used the architecture of the gallery itself to stage a room within a room where viewers interacted with: "analog interfaces, false walls, conspiratorial pictures, and memory sculptures."

He is a co-founder of interdisciplinary art space KAJE, along with sculptor Kate Levant. He previously ran the project space Know More Games in Gowanus, alongside Brian Faucette and Miles Huston. It was located near other project spaces Primetime and 247365, which became collectively referred to as 'the Donut District,' after a nearby Dunkin Donuts. New York Times art critic Martha Schwendener wrote that it was "Spiritually somewhere between a nonprofit and a commercial space." From 2015 to 2019, he was the resident director of Lighthouse Works on Fishers Island.

== Life and work ==
Vidal was quoted in a 2005 New York Times article about a signpost around the corner from the Whitney Museum of Art, where people were leaving their admission stickers for others to use: "Sometimes people who look like-minded walk out and hand you their sticker. I guess my big thing with it is that there are plenty of people who can pay and I'm not one of them." He was referred to as "a 22-year-old painter and sculptor who lives in Ridgewood, Queens."

In 2006, Vidal attempted to organize a "surrealist county fair" at Metro Mall in Middle Village, Queens, scheduled to take place on April 1. He told a reporter for The New York Times that he pitched the event to mall management ''the first-ever opportunity for the worlds of art and science to truly merge'' by the ''Queens Artists Trust Alliance for Communally Aligned Artists.'' After The New York Times published an article on March 30, Metro Mall canceled the event, which a lawyer representing Middle Village Associates attributed to Mr. Vidal's characterization of the Mall as having an atmosphere that was "stark, impersonal" and "vast."

In 2007, Vidal's first solo show in New York City, Wood Folks is Good Folks took place at Horton Gallery. James Wagner wrote about it that "Vidal's performances and sculptures evoke traditional folk-tale forms and, well, a lot of slacker high school shop, but his subject appears to be a contemporary and grown-up concern with the absurdity of a world created by the rude political, commercial and religious heirs to that more humble and more muted America and its naive how-to culture."

For four years, Vidal worked as an assistant for artist Justin Lieberman, eventually showing him at his project space, Know More Games.

His 2014 solo exhibition Nothing is Possible In There is No Future focused on corresponding and collaborating with a childhood friend referred to as "Jerry," who at the time was on death row in Huntsville, Texas. The two had first met at Burbank Middle School, and had been arrested together while doing graffiti as teenagers in Houston, Texas.

In 2021, Vidal curated a group exhibition at Lubov Gallery, titled Disease Was My Life Coach.

When Steve Albini died in 2024, he told reporter Annie Armstrong that he learned from the musician "that your medium can, and should vary wildly because your spirit will come through more strongly if you’re always pushing forward” and “that your sound (or style) can be brutal and punishing while still creating a sense of relief, and joy.”

He is a board member of several non-profit organizations including: Blank Forms, Montez Press Radio, and Do Not Research, as well as KAJE, which he co-founded. Reporting shows that the Jacques Louis Vidal Charitable Fund has given money to organizations such as Prairie, a gallery in Chicago, and Beverlys, a bar and art-space in Manhattan.

Vidal shows his artwork with Harkawik and Broadway Gallery.

Vidal's work is in the collection of The Bunker in West Palm Beach.
