= Ryan Bock =

American painter

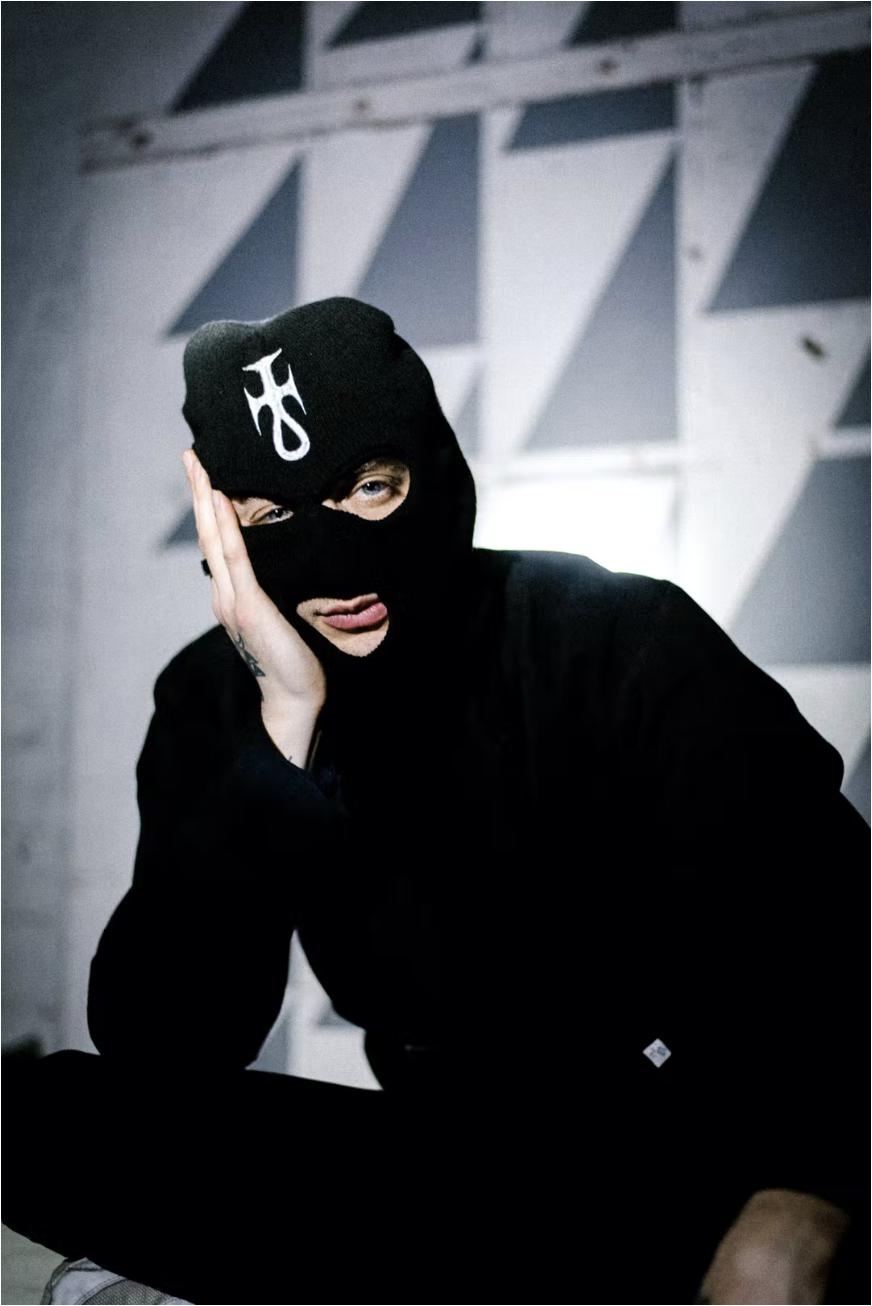
- Education: School of the Art Institute of Chicago
- Known for: Painting, Sculpture
- Website: http://www.bock.haus

Ryan Bock is an American artist known for his painting and sculpture, almost exclusively in a black, white, and gray palette.

He is a graduate of the School of the Art Institute of Chicago. Primarily associated with Ki Smith Gallery, his work has also appeared in spaces such as Mana Contemporary and Spring/Break Art Show. He has collaborated with and appears in the work of Naomi Falk, who published his monograph Ryan Bock: I am not funded by the CIA for Crop Circle Press. He has received profiles in Hyperallergic, BOMB, Artnet, and others. His work references Czech Cubism and German Expressionism, with collections specifically in reference to The Cabinet of Dr. Caligari and Peter Schlemihl among others.

== Exhibitions ==
- 2025 - LICH, Ki Smith Gallery, New York City
- 2023 - Ode to Duchamp, A Liar, Ki Smith Gallery, New York City
- 2022 - I'm Not Funded by the CIA, Ki Smith Gallery, New York City
- 2021 - Anti-Christmas Special, Ki Smith Gallery, New York City
- 2020 - Works on Paper, Pt. 2 Gallery, Oakland
- 2019 - Somnambulist, Ki Smith Gallery, New York City
- 2019 - See Something, Say Something, Spring/Break Art Show, New York City
- 2018 - The Golem, Deep Space, Jersey City
- 2018 - I'm Afraid of Americans, Ground Effect, Paris
- 2018 - Bocktropolis, 3.0, Garden Studio, New York City
- 2017 - Bocktropolis, 1.0, Mana Contemporary, Jersey City

== Bibliography ==
2024 - Ryan Bock: I am not funded by the CIA, ed. Naomi Falk, Crop Circle Press
