= Chris Molnar =

American writer, editor, publisher

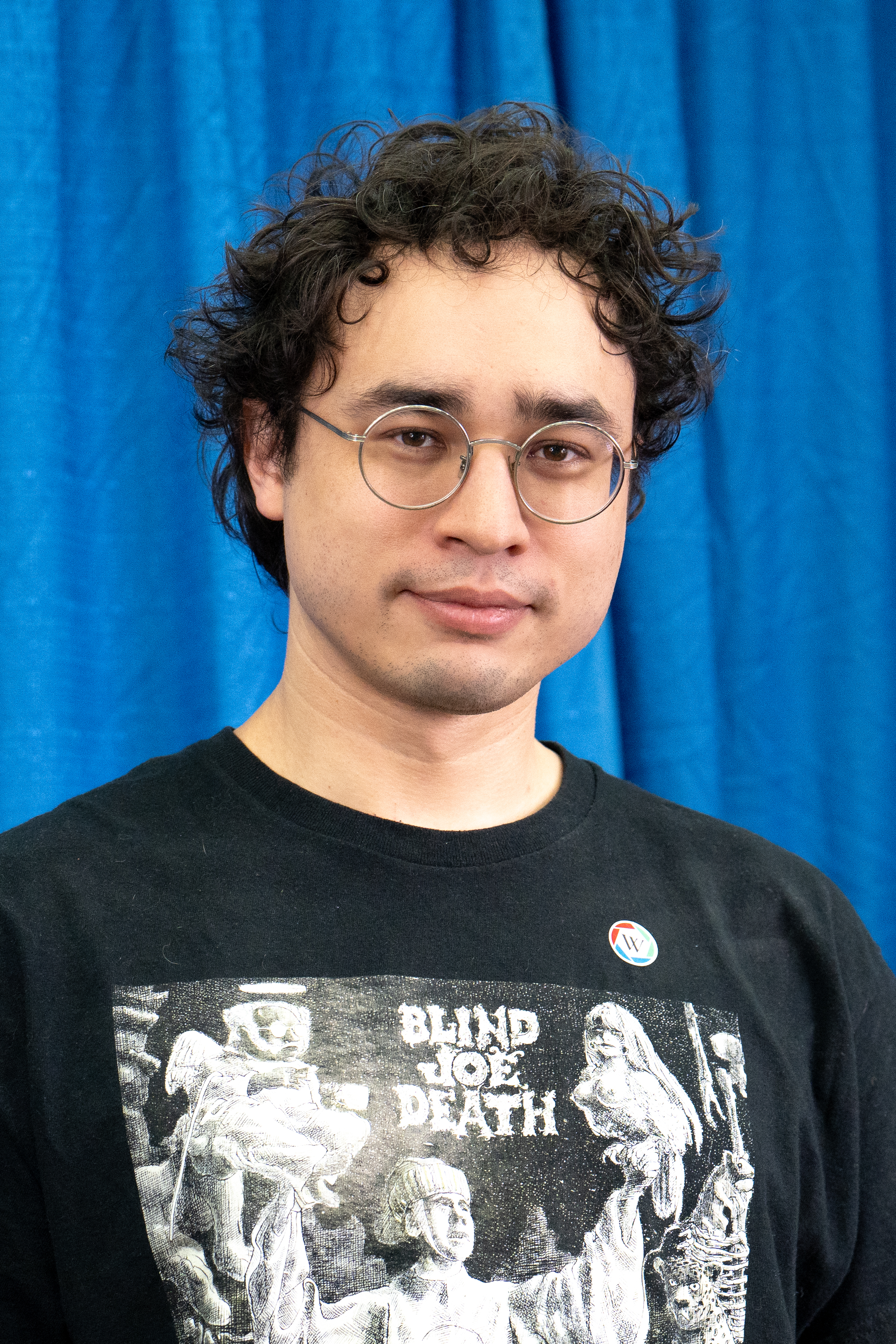
- Molnar at AWP 2026
- Occupations: Writer, editor, filmmaker and publisher
- Writing career
- Language: English
- Genres: Fiction, criticism
- Notable works: The Writer's Block, Archway Editions
- Website: chrismolnar.org

Chris Molnar is a writer, editor, filmmaker and publisher. He is co-founder of The Writer's Block and Archway Editions.

== Work ==
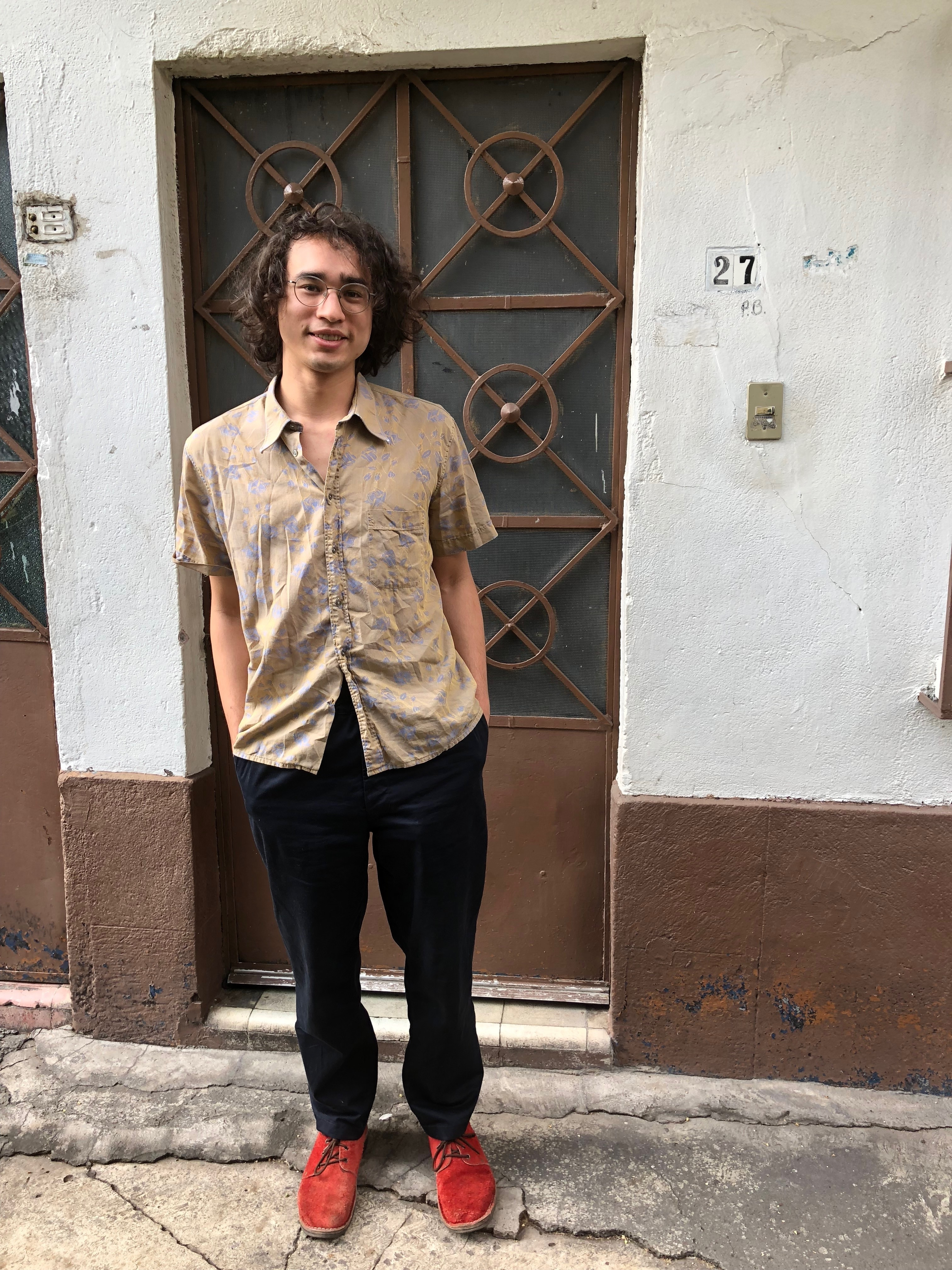
Molnar in 2018

A graduate of Calvin College with an MFA from Columbia University School of the Arts, Molnar has written for The Believer, cokemachineglow, Los Angeles Review of Books, Cleveland Review of Books, BOMB, Interview, The Shadow, and Esquire, among others. Prior to The Writer's Block, he worked with the other co-founders as store manager at 826NYC/The Brooklyn Superhero Supply Co. A longtime resident of Bullet Space, the artists' collective and former squat in the East Village, he has also written texts for the nearby Ki Smith Gallery, and curated for the literary KGB Bar.

Molnar's published work includes editing the anthologies Unpublishable and Archways 1, which feature authors such as Jason Koo, James Cañón, Jean Kyoung Frazier, and Cyrée Jarelle Johnson - as well as fiction in NDA: An Autofiction Anthology. In 2025 he was co-editor on a full volume of the last poems of John Farris. In 2026 Molnar and the Archway staff announced a new imprint, Enigma Editions, distributed by Penguin Random House through MIT Press. He has work in progress with Naomi Falk, and his novel Heaven's Oblivion, about Nell Theobald, will be published in 2027.

== Bibliography ==
=== Fiction ===
- Heaven's Oblivion (2027). Enigma Editions ISBN 978-1971984049

=== Edited volumes ===
- Unpublishable (2020). Archway Editions ISBN 978-1576879719
- Archways 1 (2023). Archway Editions ISBN 978-1576879757
- Last Poems by John Farris (2025). Archway Editions ISBN 978-1648230509

=== Anthologies ===
- Unpublishable (2020). Archway Editions ISBN 978-1576879719 "End of time" from Hellscape
- NDA: An Autofiction Anthology (2022). Archway Editions ISBN 978-1576879931 "Radio Cure" from Hellscape
