= Naomi Falk =

Writer, editor, and publisher

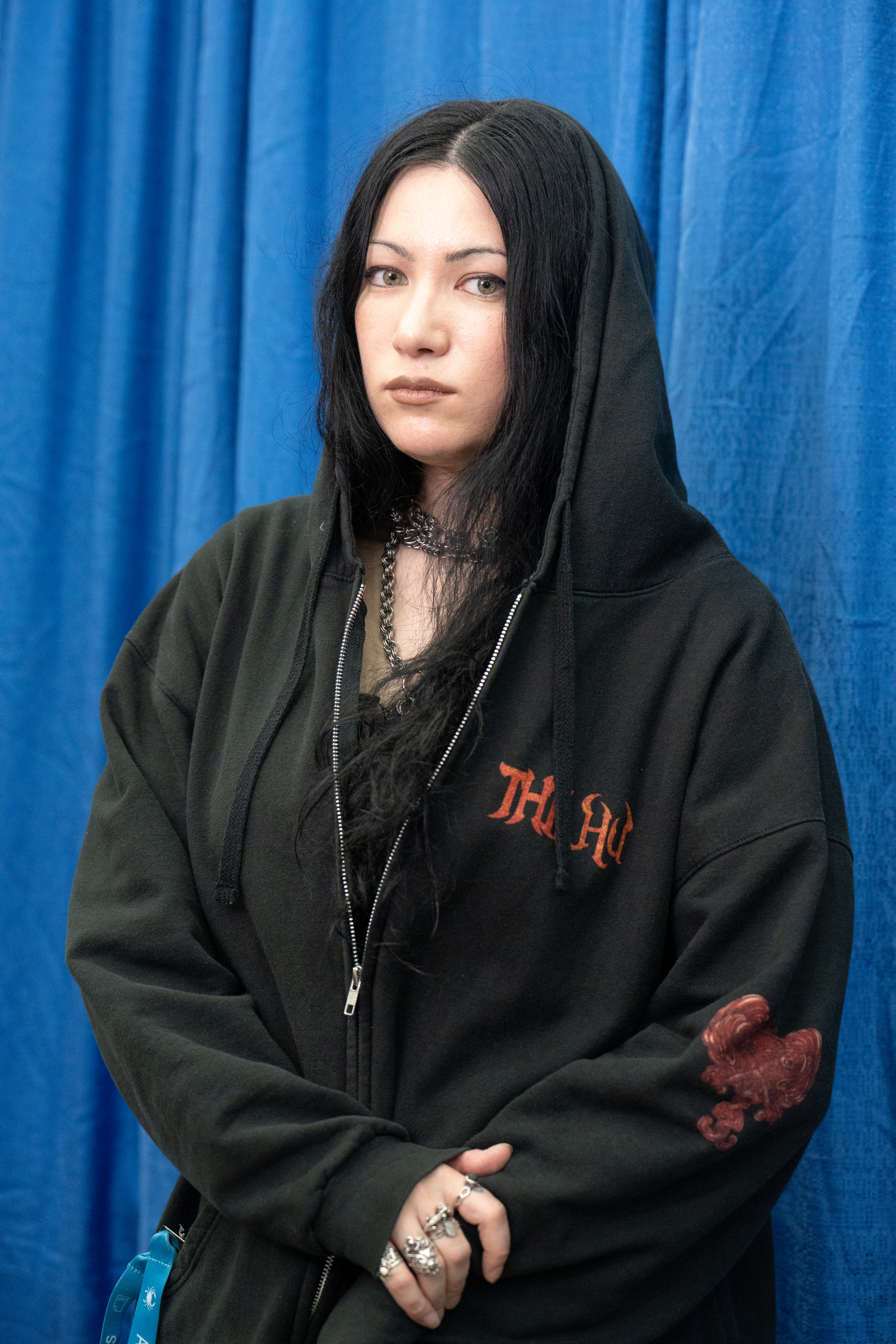
- Falk at AWP 2026
- Occupations: Writer, editor, and publisher
- Writing career
- Language: English
- Genres: Memoir, criticism
- Notable work: The Surrender of Man (2025)
- Website: celardolor.com

Naomi Falk is a writer, editor, publisher, and chainmaille artisan from Seattle. She was senior editor at Archway Editions, the literary imprint of powerHouse Books distributed by Simon & Schuster; publisher of Crop Circle Press; and co-founder of the editorial department at Ki Smith Gallery. In addition, she has worked in publications at MoMA. At Archway she edited writers such as Claire Donato and Lindsey Webb. For Crop Circle she has published work including a monograph by Ryan Bock.

A graduate of Columbia University, Falk has written criticism extensively for BOMB, and has contributed to Montez Press Radio and WFMU. Her book, The Surrender of Man, was published in 2025 by Inside the Castle, discussed at length with Chris Molnar (with whom she has a work in progress) in Los Angeles Review of Books. The volume also featured themed nail art designed by BITTER000000 as a tie-in to release.

Falk practices Transcendental Meditation.

== Books ==
- The Surrender of Man (2025). Inside the Castle ISBN 978-1576879719
