= The Believer (magazine) =

American magazine

- October 2009 issue, Vol. 7, No. 8. Cover illustration by Charles Burns. The cover depicts, clockwise from the upper left, Vlad Țepeş, Fidel Castro, Agnès Varda, and Jonathan Ames.
- Categories: Literature
- Frequency: 4 per year
- First issue: March 2003; 23 years ago
- Company: McSweeney's
- Country: United States
- Language: English
- Website: www.thebeliever.net
- ISSN: 1543-6101

The Believer is an American quarterly magazine of interviews, essays, and reviews, founded by the writers Heidi Julavits, Vendela Vida, and Ed Park in 2003. The magazine is a fifteen-time finalist for the National Magazine Award.

Between 2003 and 2015, The Believer was published by McSweeney's, the independent press founded in 1998 by Dave Eggers. Eggers designed The Believer's original design template. Park left The Believer in 2011, with Julavits and Vida continuing to serve as editors. In 2017, the magazine found a new home, moving from McSweeney's to the Beverly Rogers, Carol C. Harter Black Mountain Institute, an international literary center at the University of Nevada, Las Vegas.

In October 2021, the UNLV College of Liberal Arts announced that the February/March 2022 issue of Believer would be the final issue published. UNLV then sold the magazine to digital marketing company Paradise Media, which in turn sold it back to its original publisher, McSweeney's, where it resumed print publication.

== History ==
The Believer was first published in April 2003 in San Francisco by friends who planned to "focus on writers and books we like", with a nod to "the concept of the inherent Good". The magazine is a fifteen-time finalist for the National Magazine Award, with contributors ranging from writers such as Hilton Als, Anne Carson, Nick Hornby, Susan Straight, and William T. Vollmann to emerging talents for whom the magazine has been a proving ground, including Eula Biss, Gideon Lewis-Kraus, Leslie Jamison, Rachel Kaadzi Ghansah, and Rivka Galchen.

The print edition was initially published monthly. From late 2007 until September 2014, the print magazine came out 9 times per year, including annual Art, Music, and Film issues that sometimes featured a CD or DVD insert or other ephemera. In 2005, it was printing about 15,000 copies of its regular issues.

Originally published by McSweeney's Publishing, The Believer was purchased by UNLV in 2017 with funding provided by philanthropist Beverly Rogers. In 2021, the editor-in-chief resigned and the funding for the magazine was withdrawn months later. After UNLV announced that the magazine would be shut down, it rejected an offer from McSweeney's to take back the publication and instead sold The Believer to digital marketing company Paradise Media. The change in ownership was announced by a tweet from a Paradise-owned website, SexToyCollective.com. There was public criticism of the UNLV decision, including from Rogers, but the university spokesperson said it was "a sound business decision and the best step forward". Paradise responded to the criticism by working quickly with McSweeney's to restore ownership of the magazine to its original publisher.

== Description ==
The Believer is a magazine, its co-editor Heidi Julavits wrote in 2003, that urges readers and writers to "reach beyond their usual notions of what is accessible or possible". In 2004, the critic Peter Carlson praised the magazine's essays as "highbrow but delightfully bizarre". Its book reviews may assess writers of other eras and interviews with writers, artists, musicians and directors often conducted by colleagues in their fields. In 2003, Ploughshares editor Don Lee called it a "utopian literary magazine. This is the sort of thing everyone dreams of – having this quality of staff on board." Writing in The New York Times in 2005, A. O. Scott described the magazine as part of "a generational struggle against laziness and cynicism, to raise once again the banners of creative enthusiasm and intellectual engagement", noting its "cosmopolitan frame of reference and an eclectic internationalism", mixing pop genres with literary theory. "The common ground n+1 and The Believer occupy: a demand for seriousness that cuts against ingrained generational habits of flippancy and prankishness."

== Contents ==
The magazine includes several feature essays in each issue but also draws on a stable of recurring features. Regular columns include "Stuff I've Been Reading" by Nick Hornby, a mixture of book discussion and musings; "Sacrifice Zone", a rotating guest column about regularly ignored places; and others. Past columns include "Sedaratives", an advice column founded by Amy Sedaris that hosted a guest contributor every issue, such as Buck Henry, Eugene Mirman, and Thomas Lennon; "Ask Carrie", an advice column penned by Carrie Brownstein; "Real Life Rock Top Ten: A Monthly Column of Everyday Culture and Found Objects", written by Greil Marcus; "What the Swedes Read", by Daniel Handler, which examined the work of Nobel Prize Winners; and "Musin's and Thinkin's", by Jack Pendarvis. Each issue includes four feature-length interviews with writers, artists, filmmakers, comedians, and policy makers. All issues also include poetry, reviews of small-press book releases, and some contain a two-page, multi-color design feature called "Schema", whose theme has ranged from "Forensic Sketches of Literary Criminals" to "Habitats of Regional Burger Chains".

== Illustration ==
Illustrations and cartoons are featured throughout the magazine. Until late 2014, the cover illustrations for all regular issues were done by Charles Burns, while most of the other portraits and line drawings are by Kristian Hammerstad (following Tony Millionaire and Gilbert Hernandez). Michael Kupperman's Four-Color Comics has appeared in many issues, and in most issues a series of images from a given artist or other source run as spot illustrations throughout the articles à la The New Yorker. The Believer debuted a comics section in the 2009 Art Issue, edited by Alvin Buenaventura, that includes strips by Anders Nilsen, Lilli Carré, Simon Hanselmann and Matt Furie.

== Book publishing and book awards ==
McSweeney's has published a number of books under The Believer Books imprint, such as Nick Hornby's The Polysyllabic Spree (2004), Housekeeping vs. The Dirt (2006), Shakespeare Wrote for Money (2008), and More Baths Less Talking (2012), collections of his "Stuff I've Been Reading" column. Other titles include Tom Bissell's Magic Hours (2012), Tamler Sommers's A Very Bad Wizard: Morality Behind the Curtain (2009), and anthologies of essays and interviews including Read Hard (2009) and Read Harder (2014), The Believer Book of Writers Talking to Writers (2008), Always Apprentices (2013), and Confidence, or the Appearance of Confidence (2014).

Since 2005, the Believer Book Award is presented annually to novels and story collections the magazine's editors thought were the "strongest and most under-appreciated" of the year. A shortlist and longlist are announced, along with readers' favorites, then a final winner is selected by the magazine's editors. In 2011, the Believer Poetry Award was inaugurated using the same model. Since 2015, the editors' favorites book selections have been compiled and annotated on The Believer Logger.

== Controversy ==
In May 2021 Joshua Wolf Shenk resigned as editor-in-chief of The Believer and as artistic and executive director of The Black Mountain Institute of The University of Nevada after reportedly exposing himself during a Zoom meeting. Employees had accused him of previous inappropriate behavior.
