= Black Mountain Institute =

Literary center in Las Vegas, Nevada

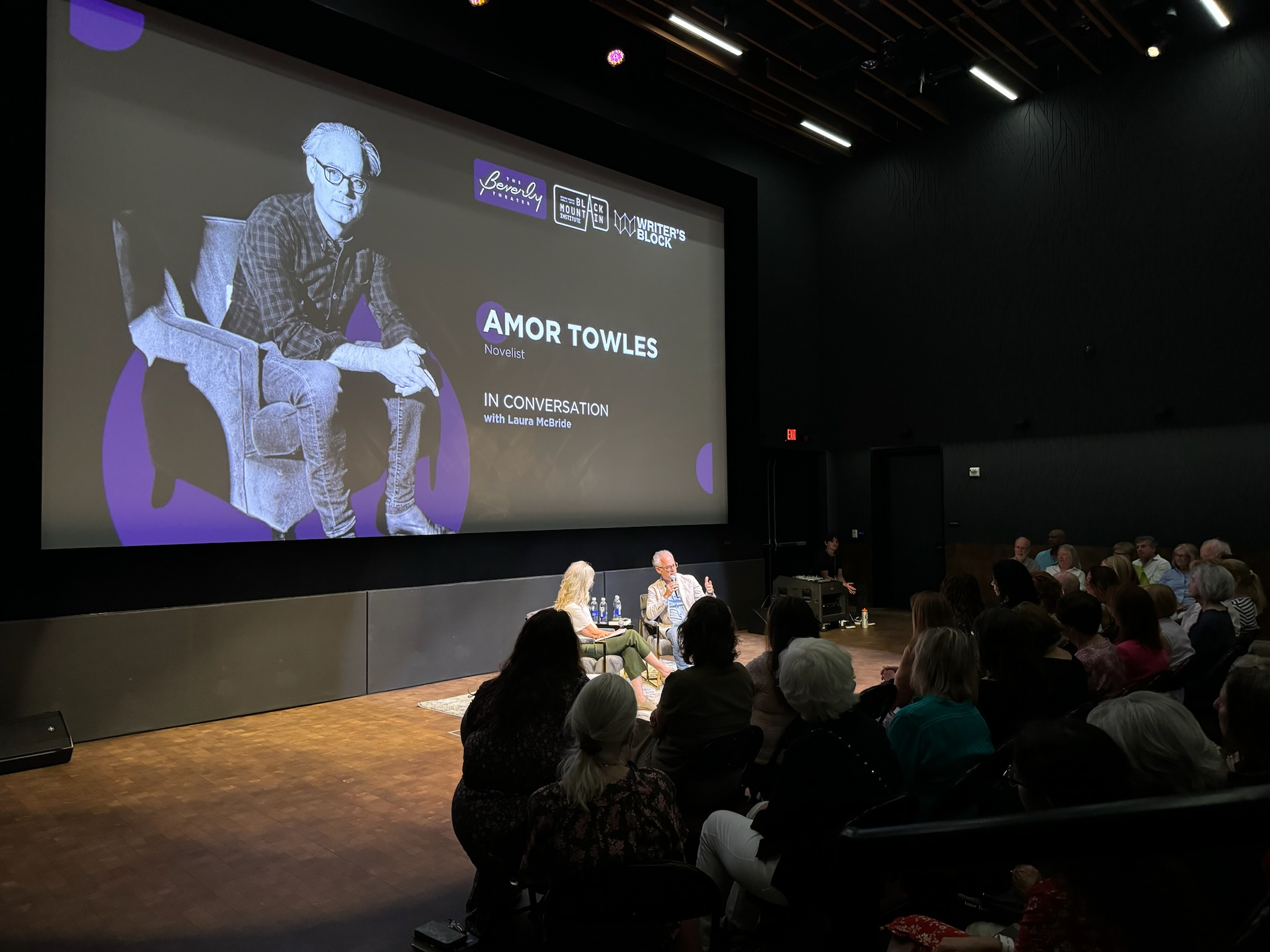
Amor Towles in conversation with Laura McBride at an institute event in collaboration with the Beverly Theater and The Writer's Block

The Black Mountain Institute, formally called the Beverly Rogers, Carol C. Harter Black Mountain Institute, is the literary center at the University of Nevada, Las Vegas. The institute provides various fellowships, programs, community events, and spaces in order to foster the literary arts in Las Vegas, specifically with an emphasis on climate and environmental narratives.

== History ==
The Black Mountain Institute was established in 2006 by Carol Harter, then-president of the University of Nevada, Las Vegas, who stepped down from her role to serve as the director the institute.

In 2013, the Rogers Foundation, established by Jim Rogers and Beverly Rogers, donated $10 million to the institute to support its operations, launch the $50,000 Black Mountain Institute Prize for Fiction, and open a new building now called the Beverly Rogers Literature and Law Building. It also allowed more funding for MFA and PhD students and fellows. Later, in March of 2015, the Rogers Foundation gave an additional $20 million to the institute, which allowed it to add a literary nonfiction track to its writing curricula, a partnership with the University of Nevada, Las Vegas College of Fine Arts for dramatic writing, and an additional budget with which to hire faculty and graduate assistants.

In May of 2015, Harter stepped down and passed the director role onto Joshua Wolf Shenk. Later, in 2021, Shenk stepped down from his position due to an incident in which Shenk "exposed himself" on a Zoom call, which The Los Angeles Times reported on. Soon after, several staff at the Black Mountain Institute and its Believer magazine penned an open letter contesting the Times report, stating that the Shenk incident was not an isolated event but rather one in a much longer history of "inappropriate and disrespectful behavior that belies a chronic lack of care and concern for the comfort, boundaries, and safety of the staff".

After Shenk's resignation, John P. Tuman served as an interim director until 2022, when Colette LaBouff was chosen to serve as the institute's next director.

== Programs ==
=== Fellowships ===
The institute provides two Shearing Fellowships every year to writers who have published at least one book. The fellowship provides support for writers to live, work, and participate in the literary scene in Las Vegas over the course of a year.

The institute also provides City of Asylum Fellowships to writers fleeing from persecution and/or censorship in their home countries. Past fellows have included Syl Cheney-Coker, a writer from Sierra Leone; Er Tai Gao, an artist from China; and Jorge Olivera Castillo, a formerly incarcerated independent journalist from Cuba. The fellowship was started in 2001 by Sarah Ralston and professor Richard Wiley with help from various writers and community members, including Wole Soyinka.

=== Festival ===
Every year, the institute hosts a festival at various venues in downtown Las Vegas featuring writing, music, film, and visual arts. Previously called the Believer Festival after the former institute-controlled Believer magazine, the institute took a two-year hiatus during the COVID-19 pandemic and relaunched the festival as the Black Mountain Institute Festival in May of 2024. Authors in the 2024 lineup included Maggie Nelson, Roxane Gay, and Eve Ewing, and more. Community partners have included Nevada Humanities, National Endowment for the Humanities, Discovery Children's Museum, and others.

=== Events ===
In partnership with departments at the University of Nevada, Las Vegas, as well as The Writer's Block, the Beverly Theater, and other venues across Downtown Las Vegas, the institute regularly hosts events with authors such as conversations, book signings, and readings. Previous events have featured authors like Teju Cole, Diana Khoi Nguyen, Pemi Aguda, Danzy Senna, André Aciman, Vi Khi Nao, and Stephen Bright.

=== Black Mountain Radio ===
In October of 2020, the institute launched Black Mountain Radio, a project featuring various hosts and guests in the arts and literary worlds, as well as involvement from fellows, students, and staff from the institute and University of Nevada, Las Vegas writ large. With episodes released between 2020 and 2022, it aired on KWNK and KUNV.

=== Publishing ===
In 2017, the institute acquired the Believer magazine from McSweeney's thanks to funds from philanthropist Beverly Rogers who donated a cumulative $30 million to the institute as of 2015. Originally founded by Heidi Julavits, Vendela Vida, and Ed Park, the magazine kept Julavits and Vida on board as consultants while Shenk served as its editor.

At the end of 2021, it was announced that the magazine would be shuttering after a final issue published in early 2022. The institute cited financial problems resulting from the COVID-19 pandemic, as well as a strategic realignment within its programming. The institute sold the Believer brand to Paradise Media, a digital marketing company which replaced the literary content of the Believer website with articles designed to drive traffic. After public outcry, the Believer was sold to its original owner, McSweeney’s.

The institute currently publishes two magazines: Interim and Witness.
