= Claire Donato =

American writer and artist

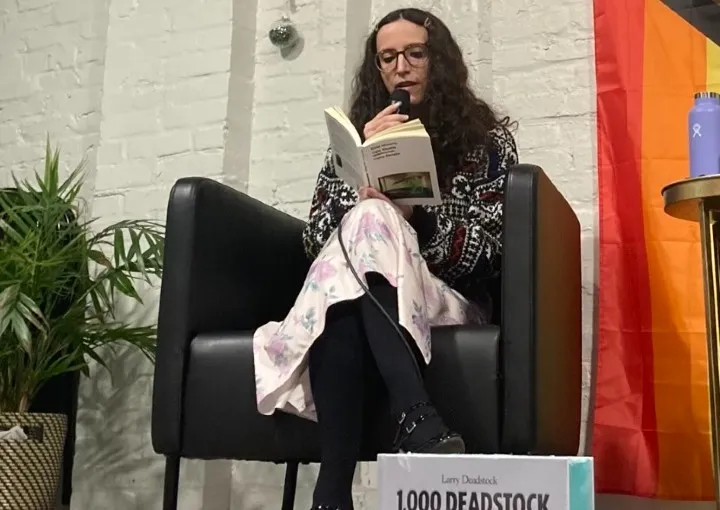
- 2023 at Greedy Reads (Baltimore)
- Born: Claire Elisabeth Donato; September 12, 1986 (age 40); Wilmington, Delaware
- Education: University of Pittsburgh (BA); Brown University (MFA)
- Notable work: Burial (2013), The Second Body (2016), The One on Earth: Selected Works of Mark Baumer (2021), Kind Mirrors, Ugly Ghosts (2023).

Claire Elisabeth Donato (born September 12, 1986, in Wilmington, Delaware) is an American writer and multidisciplinary artist based in Brooklyn, New York.

== Early life and education ==
Donato grew up in and around Pittsburgh, Pennsylvania. In 2010, she received her MFA in Literary Arts from Brown University, where she studied with C.D. Wright, John Cayley, and Keith Waldrop. Prior to attending Brown, she received a BA in English Writing from the University of Pittsburgh, where she studied with Ross Gay.

Her first language was French.

== Career ==
In addition to her writing, Donato is the creator of various feminist digital artworks and performance interventions, and is also an illustrator, photographer, singer-songwriter, and practitioner of Zen meditation. She has collaborated with artists including Anna Moschovakis, Told Slant, David Jhave Johnston, Anastasios Karnazes, Patty Gone, Naomi Falk, and Mark Baumer. She is the Assistant Chairperson of Writing at Pratt Institute, where she virtually addressed the Class of 2020 amidst the COVID-19 pandemic.

Donato is currently training to be a psychoanalyst.

== Works ==
Donato's works include publications in Forever, Parapraxis, GoldFlakePaint, The Chicago Review, The Brooklyn Rail, Oversound, VICE, DIAGRAM, The Believer, BOMB, and Harp & Altar. Her books are:

- Someone Else's Body (chapbook) (Cannibal Books, 2009)
- Burial (novella) (Tarpaulin Sky Books, 2013)
- The Second Body (poetry collection) (Poor Claudia, 2016)
- The One on Earth: Selected Works on Mark Baumer (introduction to prose anthology) (Fence Books, 2021)
- Kind Mirrors, Ugly Ghosts (short story collection) (Archway Editions, 2023)
- Woebegone (chapbook) (Theaphora, 2024)

Her collaboration with Jeff T. Johnson on SPECIAL AMERICA was an ongoing performance that ended in 2016. This work started within the electronic literature community as a performance and was translated as a movie. She collaborated on netprovs such as All Time High. Her video-based work, Material Studies, has been shown at the New York Museum of Modern Art (MoMA) PS1, Knockdown Center, Harvard University, and University Fernando Pessoa.

== Awards ==
New York State Council on the Arts (NYSCA) Grant in Fiction

John Hawkes Prize in Fiction for Burial judged by Robert Coover.

2020 Distinguished Teacher Award at Pratt Institute
