= Beverly Rogers =

American philanthropist

Beverly Rogers is an American philanthropist. In 2014, she and her husband, Jim Rogers, founded the Rogers Foundation, a foundation trust specializing in education and the arts. In 2019, Rogers developed the Lucy, a literary and arts space, and in 2023, she debuted the Beverly Theater, a local film, performance, and arts venue, both of which are in the downtown Las Vegas area.

== Early life ==
In 1962, Rogers moved from Pennsylvania to Nevada with her family, where her stepfather became a mechanic for a bowling alley, while her mother managed the office for an orthodontist. She then went to school at the University of Nevada, Las Vegas and sold advertisements for television and radio in the 1980s, after which she worked at KSNV-TV.

In 1997, Rogers married her husband, Jim Rogers, after which she began getting involved in nonprofit work and philanthropy. Together, they worked on several projects such as the Lone Pine Film Festival and the Black Mountain Institute at the University of Nevada, Las Vegas.

== Career ==
=== Rogers Foundation ===
In 2013, Rogers and her husband, Jim Rogers, established a foundation trust called the Rogers Foundation with the "broad mission to address education." After her husband's death from cancer in June of 2014, Rogers began focusing her philanthropic efforts on education and the arts.

Since its establishment, the Rogers Foundation has funded college scholarships, programs like Educate Nevada Now and CORE Academy, and the Heart of Education awards for teachers. For a Las Vegas Review-Journal piece in 2021, the foundation reported approximately $89 million in disbursements toward projects relevant to its goals.

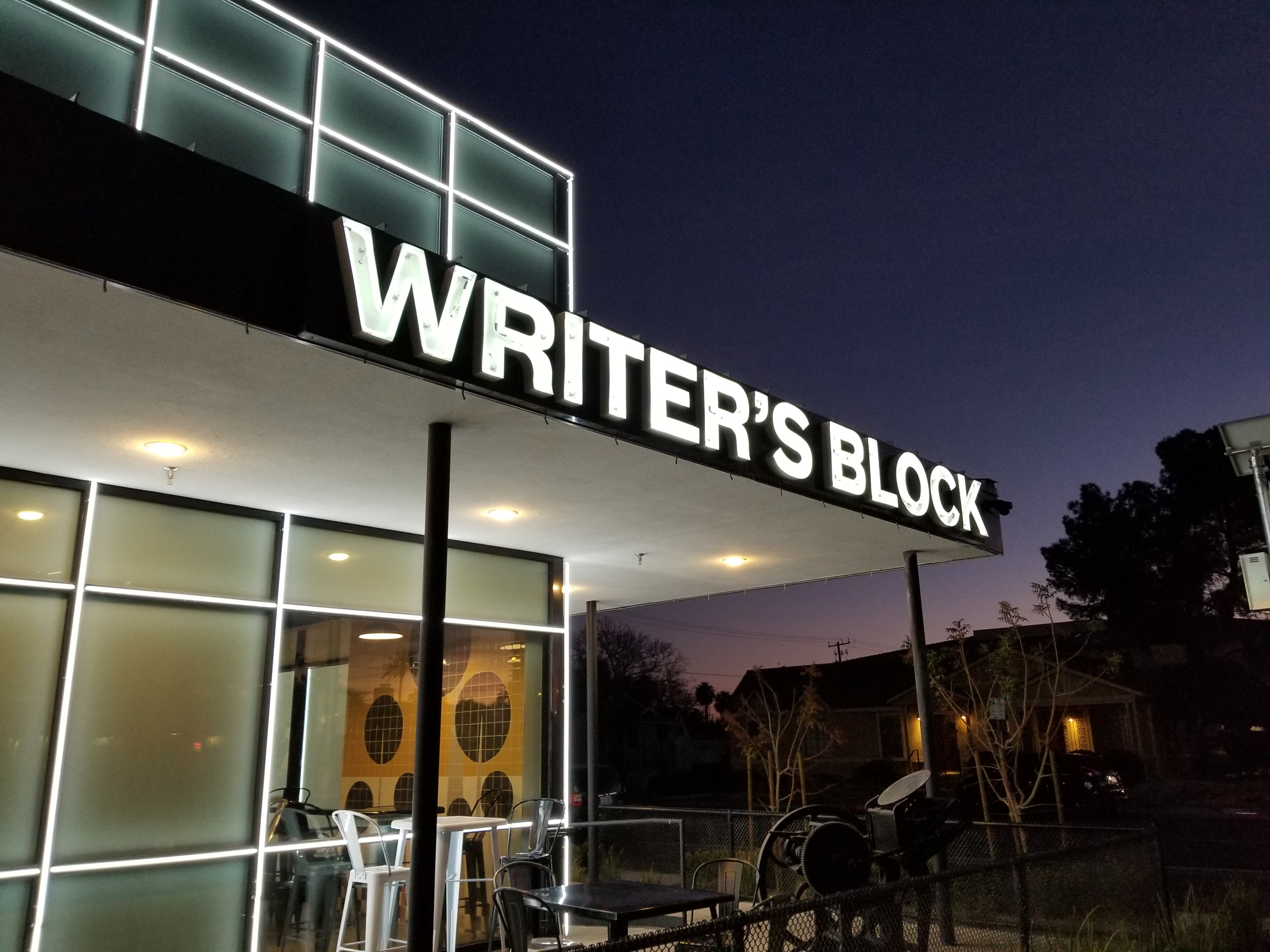
The Writer's Block after its relocation to the Lucy in 2019

=== University of Nevada, Las Vegas and the Black Mountain Institute ===
In 2013, Rogers and her husband donated $10 million to the University of Nevada, Las Vegas' Black Mountain Institute for writers. As a result, it was renamed the Beverly Rogers, Carol C. Harter Black Mountain Institute. Their funds also created the Beverly Rogers Literature and Law Building and revitalized the institute's City of Asylum program.

In 2019, Rogers donated $5 million to the university's Special Collections in Lied Library to fund a curator of rare books and support the department's operations. In 2024, she donated rare books from her personal library to the collection, including rare editions of Jane Austen and George Eliot, as well as a book that Virginia Woolf had owned.

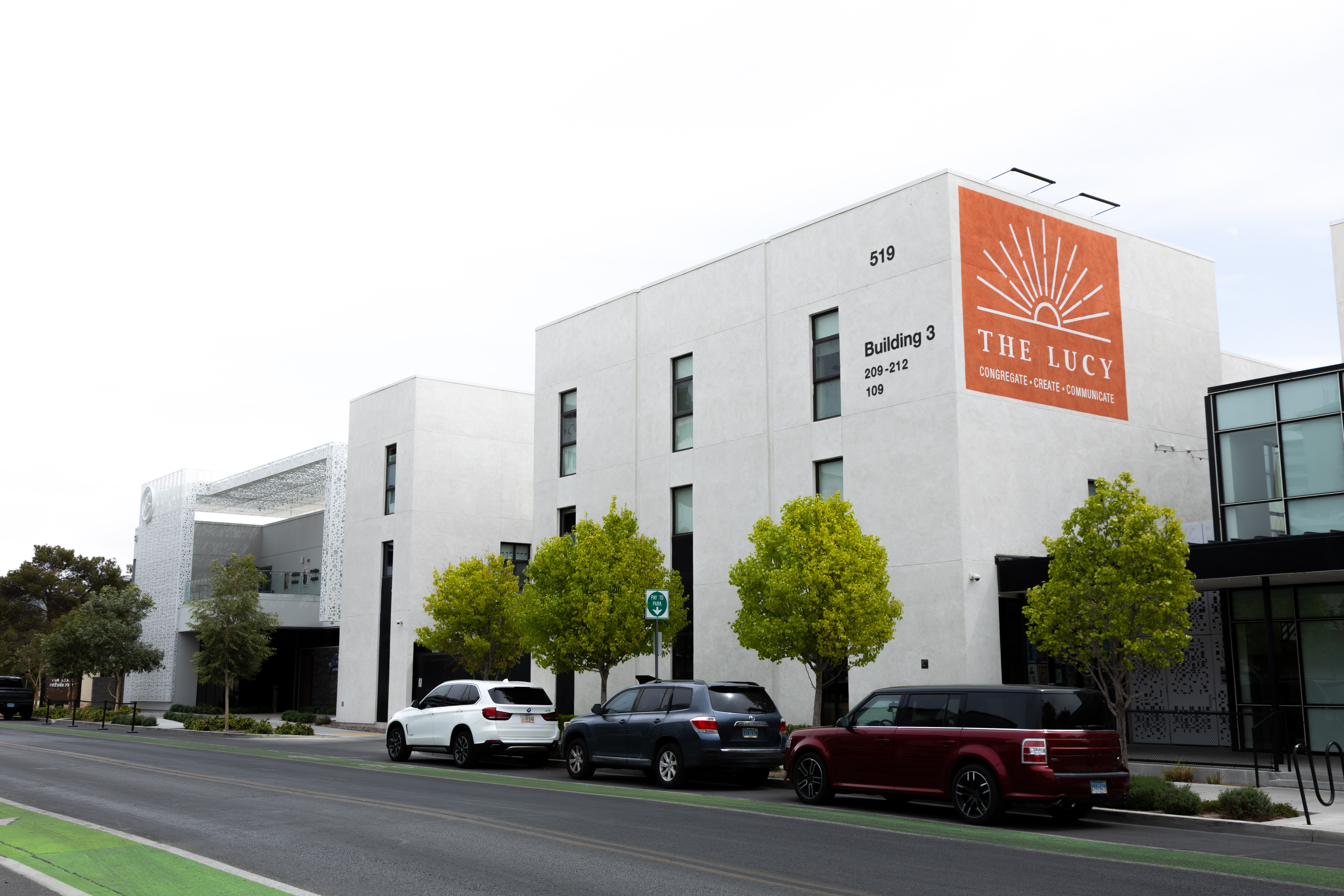
The Lucy complex

=== The Lucy ===
In 2014, Rogers opened the Lucy on Sixth Street and Bonneville Avenue, a literary and arts space in downtown Las Vegas which hosts and partners with local organizations like The Writer's Block, which Rogers partially owns, and the Black Mountain Institute. The Lucy features an outdoor venue as well as twelve loft residences.

=== The Beverly Theater ===
In 2021, the Rogers Foundation unveiled plans to build a 14,000 square foot theater for film and performance in downtown Las Vegas on Sixth Street. Originally slated for a 2022 debut, the $30-million Beverly Theater opened in 2023 with 146 seats. It is considered the only art house in Las Vegas.

Under creative director Kip Kelly, the theater's programming was broadly split into three categories: Lit (literature), Live (live entertainment), and Film (with a specific attention to indie). At its Segue outdoor venue, jazz shows and author readings are typically scheduled.

Since its inception, it had fostered frequent partnerships with Rogers' other ventures like The Writer's Block and the Black Mountain Institute, featuring writers such as Teju Cole and Pemi Aguda.

In 2024, The Beverly Theater launched a film distribution component of its operations, Ink Films, in order to promote independent films in the city and beyond.
