= The Shadow (underground newspaper) =

Underground newspaper published in the Lower East Side of New York City since 1989

The Shadow is an underground newspaper published on the Lower East Side of Manhattan since 1989. The paper focuses on investigative journalism.

== Founding ==
The Shadow began in reaction to the way that events on the Lower East Side, including the Tompkins Square Park Riot, were covered by mainstream media. It also grew out of a long tradition of underground press on the Lower East Side. The newspaper was founded by Chris Flash. Paul DeRienzo and Frank Morales have been contributing writers.

== Activities ==
The newspaper has focused on issues central to the Lower East Side including squats, gentrification, and struggles against placing a curfew on Tomkins Square Park. It paused publishing in 2008 and returned in August, 2013.

In addition to publishing a newspaper, Chris Flash and The Shadow have organized concerts in Tompkins Square Park.
