= Anton Bitter =

Ukrainian actor

- Born: Ukraine
- Occupations: Actor; Jeweller
- Years active: 2024–present

Anton Bitter is a Brooklyn-based actor and jeweller. He is known for his role as Tom in Sean Baker's Palme d'Or and Academy Award-winning film Anora (2024), and for his custom-made grills.

== Life and career ==
Originally from Ukraine, Bitter chose his last name when he became a US citizen. A self-taught artisan, he runs the grill-focused jewelry business BITTER000000 from Bushwick with his partner Ava María. Their pieces have been worn by Emma D'Arcy, and Naomi Falk in celebration of her book The Surrender of Man, among others. For his work in Anora, Bitter won as part of the ensemble cast from Seattle Film Critics Society, in addition to other nominations.

== Filmography ==
=== Film ===
| Year | Title | Role | Notes | Ref. |
|---|---|---|---|---|
| 2024 | Anora | Tom | | |
