= The Writer's Block =

Bookseller publisher in Las Vegas, Nevada, U.S.

Coordinates: 36.1667°N 115.1344°W

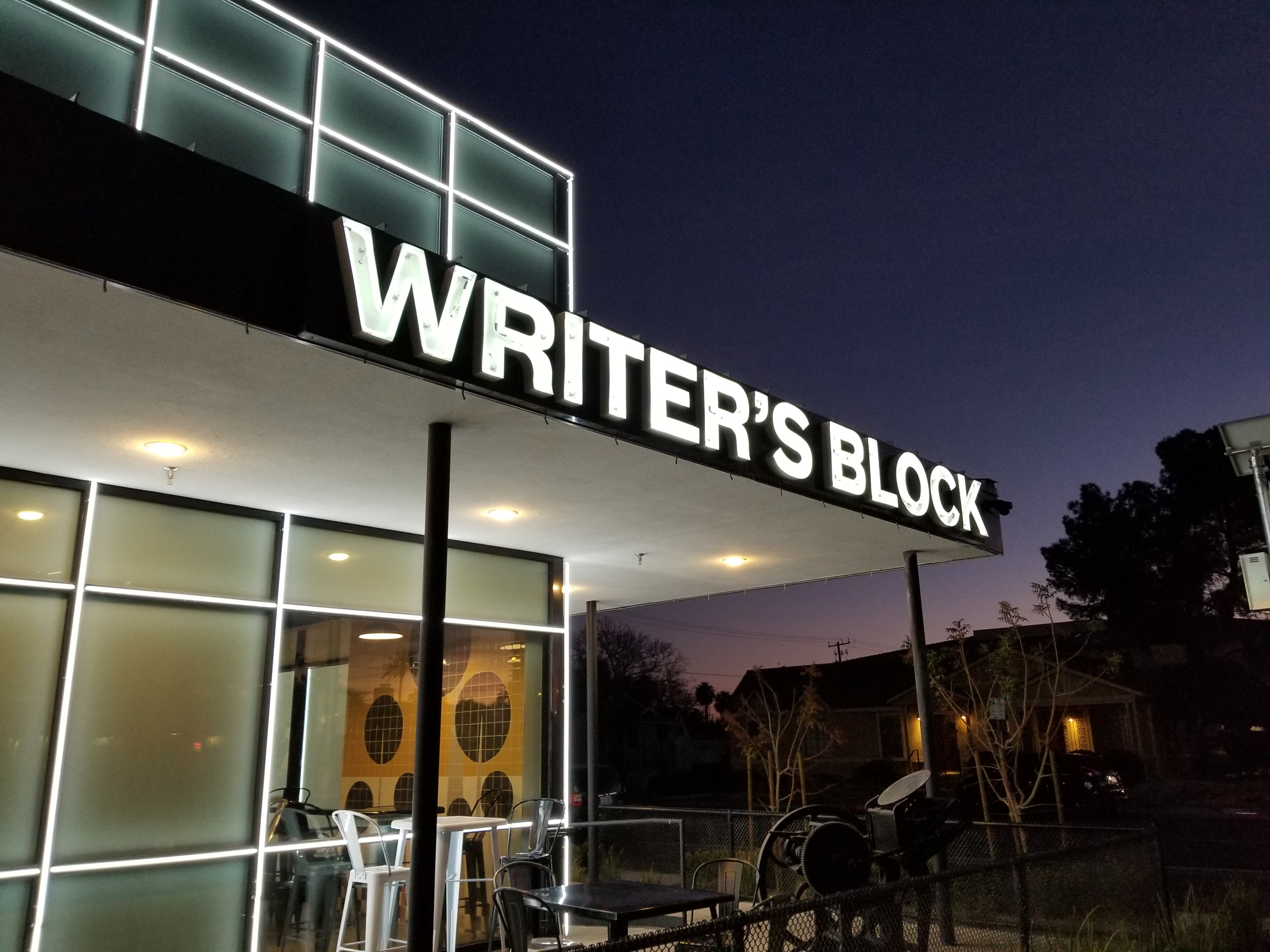
- The Writer's Block at its current location, the Lucy, in 2019
- Type: Bookstore
- Industry: Books
- Founded: 2014
- Headquarters: Las Vegas, Nevada, U.S.
- Key people: Scott Seeley, Drew Cohen, Chris Molnar
- Products: Books, periodicals, marionettes, artificial birds, anatomical models, build-your-own diorama kits
- Services: Literacy education, coffee
- Website: www.thewritersblock.org

The Writer's Block is an independent bookseller, literacy educator, and coffee shop in downtown Las Vegas.

Its bookstore has been recommended several times by publications and authors including Los Angeles Times, Tayari Jones, and Alta Journal. In 2024, it was chosen as Best Bookstore for the Las Vegas Weekly Best of Vegas list.

== Original location ==
Years before its establishment, 826NYC co-founder Scott Seeley and Drew Cohen came together with plans to found an independent bookstore in downtown Las Vegas. Beforehand, Cohen was warned severally that attempts to open an independent bookstore in the area would fail. In midst of its creation, entrepreneur Jennifer 8. Lee put Seeley and Cohen in touch with Zappos founder Tony Hsieh who, as part of his Downtown Project—a $350-million-dollar initiative to revitalize downtown Las Vegas—helped partially fund the Writer's Block.

In 2014, the Writer's Block was opened at 509 Fremont Street, a location previously occupied by a tattoo parlor, with former BSSco. store manager and Archway Editions publisher Chris Molnar.

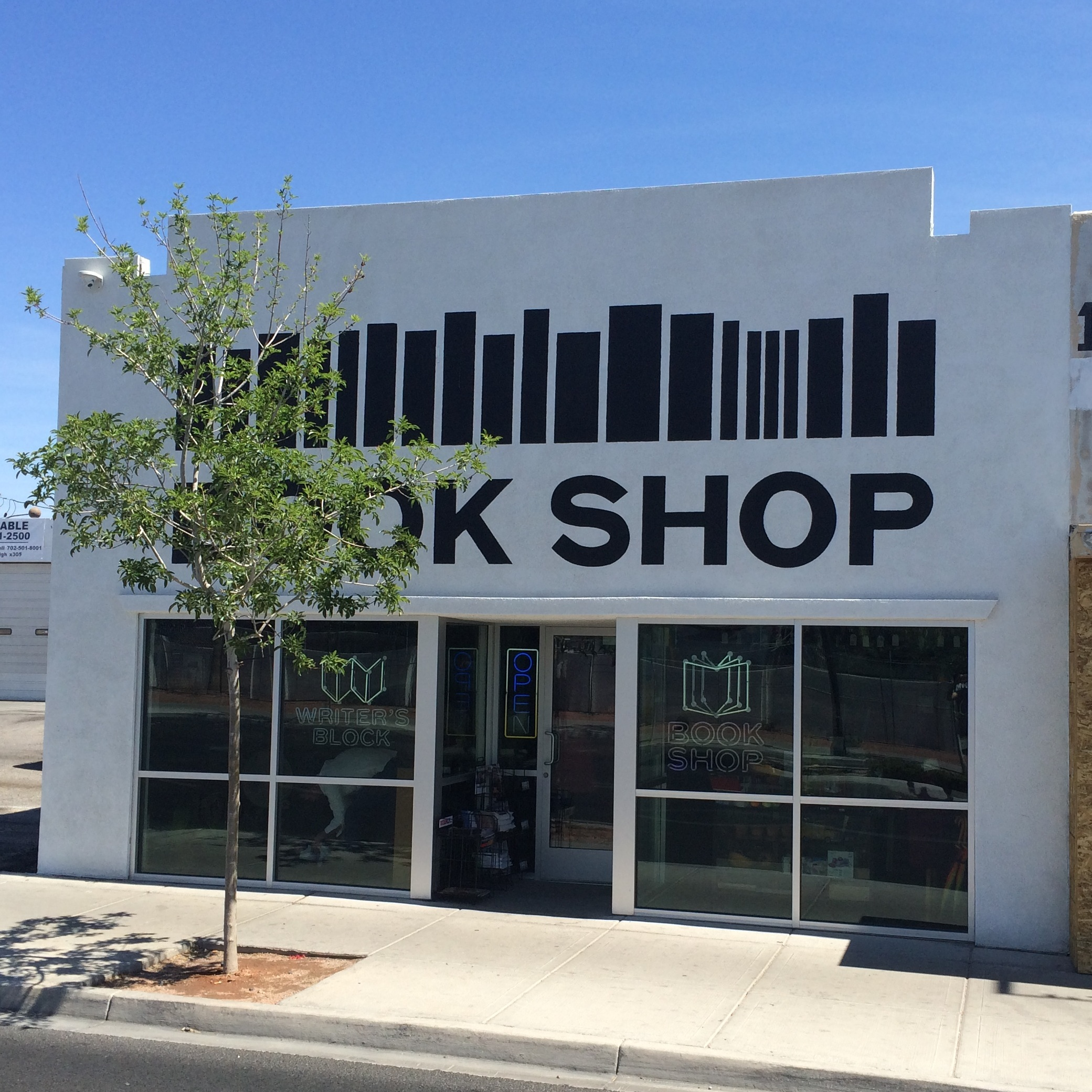
The storefront of the Writer's Block in May 2015 at its original location on Fremont Street

Behind the bookstore front, at its original Fremont Street location, was the literacy education component of the Writer's Block, known as Codex. Similar in layout to the educational area behind 826NYC's Superhero Supply Store, Codex also featured movable walls, tables and desks. It was used for free writing workshops for children ages 5-18, in addition to readings, signings, and ongoing series such as Neon Lit, the monthly reading by MFA and PHD writing students at UNLV.

== Relocation ==
In 2019, the Writer's Block relocated to the Lucy, a new art center in downtown Las Vegas on 6th Street and Bonneville Avenue established by philanthropist Beverly Rogers, who now partially owns the Writer's Block. The location utilizes 3,000 square feet for bookselling and another 800 square feet for events. During the COVID-19 pandemic, the square footage was retooled for fulfilling online orders. Along with over 20,000 books, the location has a coffee shop, while regularly hosting creative writing workshops, book clubs, and author signing events.
