= Tadaaki Kuwayama =

Japanese minimalist artist (1932-2023)

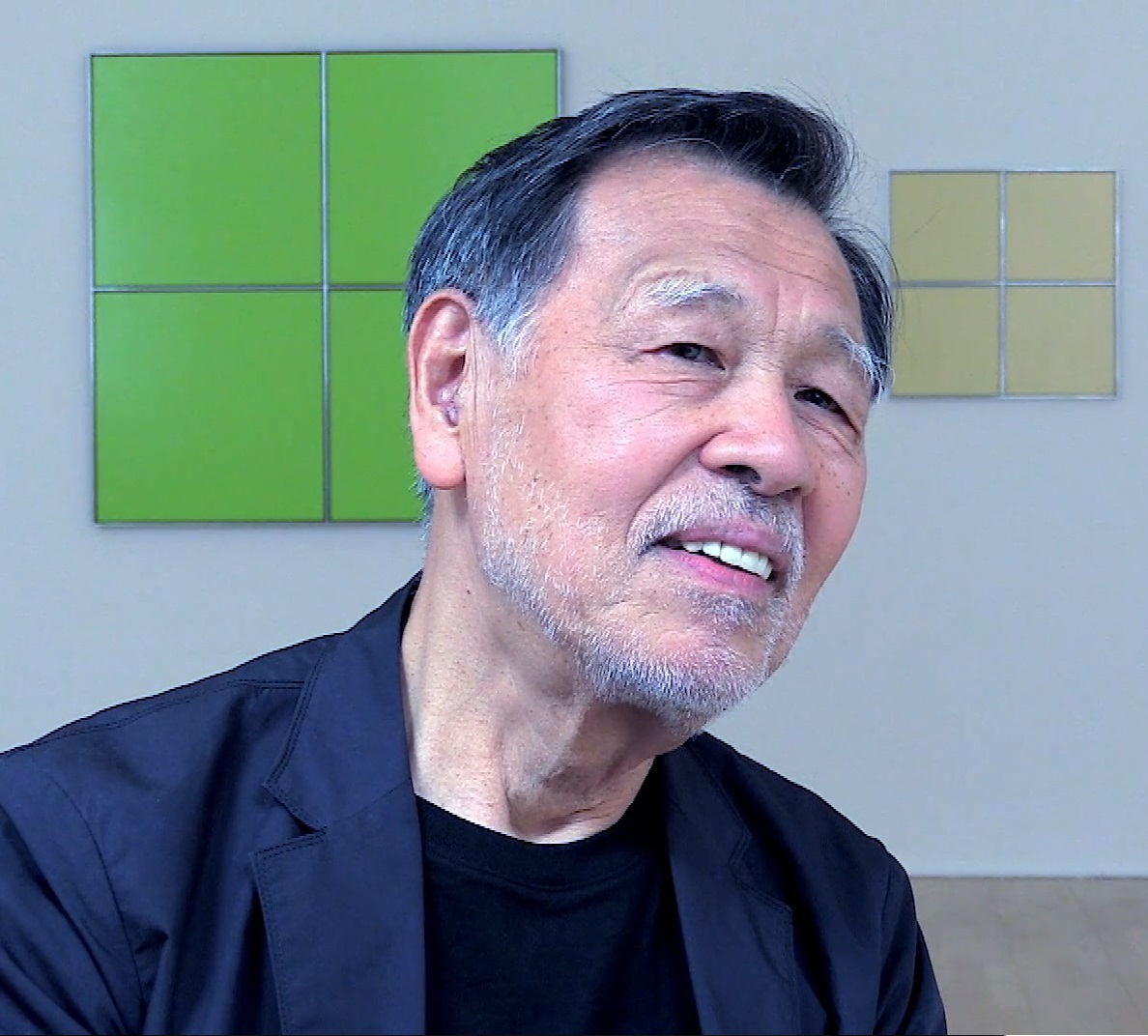
- Kuwayama in 2017
- Born: March 4, 1932; Nagoya, Japan
- Died: August 18, 2023 (aged 91); Manhattan, New York, U.S.
- Education: Tokyo National University of Fine Arts and Music
- Occupation: Painter
- Known for: Painting
- Movement: Minimalism, Geometric abstraction
- Spouse: Rakuko Naito

Tadaaki Kuwayama (March 4, 1932 – August 18, 2023) was a Japanese painter known for his contributions to minimalism.

== Career ==
After studying traditional Japanese painting (nihonga) at the Tokyo National University of Fine Arts and Music and graduating in 1956, Kuwayama, along with his wife, left Japan for New York City in 1958. There, he sought to develop his own distinctive style.

His first solo exhibition at the Green Gallery in 1961 featured Untitled: Red and Blue, a minimalist artwork featuring two distinct rectangular panels, one painted in red and the other in blue, with sharp, clean lines, and a clear separation of colors.

In later exhibitions, Kuwayama transitioned from using paper to canvas and then to more industrial materials such as titanium and Bakelite, borrowing techniques from Japanese nihonga painting technique. He also experimented using different shapes for his minimalist pieces such as triangles.

Many of Tadaaki Kuwayama's works are held in the collections of the Guggenheim Museum, the Buffalo AKG Art Museum, and various museums in Japan.

== Personal life ==
Tadaaki Kuwayama was born on March 4, 1932, in Nagoya, Japan. He met his wife, Rakuko Naito, during their studies at the Tokyo National University of Fine Arts and Music. The couple married and moved to New York in 1958, where they shared a studio. He died on August 18, 2023, in Manhattan, after a fall.
