= The Drunken Canal =

New York City print newspaper

- Editor: Michelle "Gutes" Guterman and Claire Banse
- Founded: 2020
- Final issue: 2022
- Country: United States
- Based in: New York City
- Language: English
- Website: thedrunkencanal.com

The Drunken Canal was a New York-based print newspaper. The publication was founded in 2020 by Michelle "Gutes" Guterman and Claire Banse. The paper focused on youth culture in New York's Lower East Side.

== History ==
In a New York Times article by Ben Smith, the publication was cited as a pushback against the homogenization of social media platforms. Articles published in the paper include an interview between Cat Marnell and Caroline Calloway. Its September 2021 issue was shot by Daniel Arnold and outfitted by Thom Browne. The paper partnered with the Tribeca Festival to produce a Battle of the Bands event judged by Nick Sansano and Despot. The magazine's editors were sponsored by the meal replacement drink, Soylent, and traveled to report on parties at Art Basel. The newspaper published its final issue in 2022.
