= Antonella Gambotto-Burke =

Australian author and journalist (b.1965)

- Born: Antonella Gambotto; North Sydney, New South Wales, Australia
- Occupations: author; critic; columnist; singer-songwriter
- Partner: Gavin Monaghan
- Children: 1
- Writing career
- Pen name: Antonella Black, Clavis Lumen, Ginger Meggs
- Period: 1980–present
- Genres: memoir, literary nonfiction
- Notable works: The Eclipse: A Memoir of Suicide (2004); Mama: Love, Motherhood and Revolution (2015); Apple: Sex, Drugs, Motherhood and the Recovery of the Feminine (2022); Apex Predators (2025)
- Notable awards: 1988: Cosmopolitan UK New Journalist of the Year Award
- Website: www.mamaftantonella.com

Antonella Gambotto-Burke is an Italian-Australian author, journalist and singer-songwriter based in England and known for her writing about sex, death and motherhood.

Gambotto-Burke is best known for her memoir The Eclipse: A Memoir of Suicide, and her memoir/maternal feminist polemics Mama: Love, Motherhood and Revolution and Apple: Sex, Drugs, Motherhood and the Recovery of the Feminine. In 2004, The Sydney Morning Herald named her as a high-profile member of Mensa International.

She is the vocalist and co-songwriter with the British band MAMA ft. Antonella. The band made the 2026 GRAMMY Awards longlist in categories: Best Rock Album for their debut album Apex Predators, and Best New Artist.

== Early years ==
Gambotto-Burke was born into a northern Italian Catholic family in North Sydney and lived in East Lindfield on Sydney's North Shore.

She is the first child and only daughter of the late businessman Giancarlo Gambotto, whose High Court win against WCP Ltd. changed Australian corporate law, scuppered the NRMA float, made the Australian front pages, is featured in Oxbridge law exams, and was the subject of a book edited by Ian Ramsay, Professor of Law.

Her younger brother Gianluca, a Macquarie Bank executive, suicided in 2001.

"I was raised to believe that I could achieve anything", Gambotto-Burke said in a North Shore Times cover story.

== Fiction and poetry ==
Gambotto-Burke was first published under the pseudonym "Clavis Lumen" in the Sydney Morning Herald at the age of sixteen: a satire of poet Les Murray's "An Absolutely Ordinary Rainbow", which was later included in Michele Field's anthology Shrinklit: Australia's Classic Literature Cut Down to Size.

Her first short story was published in the first on-sale issue of the Australian literary magazine Billy Blue in July 1982.

Gambotto-Burke contributed to Peter Blazey's short story anthology Love Cries: Cruel Passions, Strange Desires (1995). In the Sydney Morning Herald, Gail Cork described her contribution as "outstanding" and in Who, Margaret Smith noted its "darkly sinister" overtones. "The Astronomer", a short story presaging many of the themes in her first novel, was published in 1989. Eight years later, Gambotto-Burke's novel The Pure Weight of the Heart (also featuring an astronomer-protagonist) was published by Orion Publishing in London, and went to number six on the Sydney Morning Herald's best-seller list. It was also Tatler magazine's book of the month in the UK.

Gambotto-Burke was commissioned by artist David Bromley to write his series of short films, I Could Be Me, which were narrated by Hugo Weaving and premiered at the Adelaide Festival in 2008. In an essay, Gambotto-Burke noted that, "As scripts are founded on what Alan Alda calls the 'subsurface tectonics of emotion', the result can sometimes be a psychic slam dunk." Bromley, in a separate interview, described the film as "like a kaleidoscope of images and it is run by my poetry and short stories by Antonella. And it has a large animation component."

== Journalism ==
Gambotto-Burke was first published in The Australian at the age of eighteen.

After moving to England in 1984, Gambotto-Burke worked for the music press in London - notably, the NME and Zig Zag. She won UK Cosmopolitan magazine's New Journalist of the Year Award in 1988. She also worked for The Independent on Sunday, notably a cover story on cardiothoracic surgeons.

In 1989, Gambotto-Burke returned to Sydney, where she resumed working for The Australian as a senior feature profile writer and literary critic. She also began writing for The South China Morning Post, The Globe and Mail, Harper's Bazaar, Elle, Vogue and other major global publications. Channel Nine Entertainment Director Richard Wilkins said in an interview that, "if you're on her wavelength, the interview is a most enjoyable experience. If not, it could be quite disconcerting. The key is to be open and honest with her."

Of her journalism, author Matthew Condon wrote, "Her razor eye for the architecture of pretension and her ability to record untidied dialogue, especially the way it can betray the human mind and soul, have made her an object of fear and derision. To have been 'Gambottoed' is to have had a vein opened."

Gambotto-Burke's interviewees include Martin Amis, Elle Macpherson, Gérard Depardieu, Morrissey, Thierry Mugler, Marc Newson, Deepak Chopra, Flavio Briatore, Robert Smith, Erica Jong, Colleen McCullough, Jeffrey Archer, Princess Haya bint Al Hussein, Jerry Hall and Naomi Wolf.

Her best known comic interview – with Warwick Capper, a retired Australian rules footballer, and his wife – is included in The Best Australian Profiles (Black Inc., 2004). "The best profiles lodge deep in the public mind, such as ... Antonella Gambotto's cheerfully dopey Warwick and Joanne Capper, which presaged by years the arrival of Kath & Kim", Professor Matthew Ricketson wrote in 2005.

“The Blonde leading the Blonde” (Gambotto-Burke's interview with the Cappers) was, as writer Richard Cooke reported, reprinted several times, "and its descriptive passages – one of which described Joanne's pubic hair as 'white as the froth on a pint of Castlemaine' – became legend."

In Undercover Agent, Murray Waldren noted that "an interview with [Gambotto-Burke] often has the studied savagery of the corrida amid the crystal cruet ambience of high tea at the Ritz. Such ritualistic disembowelling, highly entertaining and in stark contrast to the asinine, PR-driven pap of most modern profiles, leave the gored stirred and very shaken."

=== Controversy ===
In London, Gambotto-Burke was employed as a music critic at the NME by editor Neil Spencer and, on the advice of her live editor Mat Snow, wrote under pseudonyms Antonella Black and Ginger Meggs. Her review of Cliff Richard's concert, in which she referred to him as "Satan" and which made national newspaper gossip columns, provoked him to sue the music journal.

Gambotto-Burke then wrote "A Man Called Horse", the first cover story about alternative rock star Nick Cave to document his since-widely-reported heroin addiction. "Shifting from bad to worse the interview collapses, along with Cave, into a series of broken thoughts and unfinished sentences," British author Adam Steiner has noted.

Cave, who had told Melody Maker journalists that he wanted to "kill" Gambotto-Burke, then wrote a song about her and Mat Snow entitled "Scum"

Gambotto-Burke, in 2022, wrote at length about her experience of Cave in Apple: Sex, Drugs, Motherhood and the Recovery of the Feminine, describing him as a "narcissist" and a "liar", and elaborating on the impact of his actions on her life and daughter.

In February 2025, Gambotto-Burke revealed in an essay that the Harry Ransom Center of the University of Texas at Austin now owns the letters Martin Amis wrote her during their secret non-sexual five-year romance. They met, the letters show, when Gambotto-Burke was 19 and Amis was 35, and he proceeded to use her as the basis for various characters in his novels for the next 35 years. His second wife Isabel Fonseca also distorted Gambotto-Burke in her first novel, Attachment, using her as the basis for the fictional husband's obsession, a 19-year-old Italian-Australian.

=== Interview anthologies ===
Lunch of Blood (Random House, 1994), Gambotto-Burke's first book and first anthology, peaked at number six on the best-seller lists. The Newcastle Herald observed that Gambotto-Burke's "command of language is delicious to the point where one wonders which came first, her wish to display her ability or the desire to share her impressions." In 1997, An Instinct for the Kill, her second anthology, was published to mixed reviews by HarperCollins. (The Age critic Katherine Wilson singled out the Capper interview as "laugh-out-loud" funny.)

In The Best Australian Profiles, Professor Matthew Ricketson wrote the introduction to Gambotto-Burke's work: "[She] is probably the closest Australia has come to having a profile writer who is a celebrity in their own right ... and from the early 1990s readers became as interested in Gambotto-Burke as they were in the people she profiled."

Bestselling The Wolf of Wall Street (book) author Jordan Belfort, whom Gambotto-Burke interviewed for "maybe six hours", wrote "Chaos Theory", the foreword to her anthology MOUTH. In it, he said that "She also has an edge to her - let's just say I wouldn't want to be on her bad side. She has her own moral compass."

=== Recent journalism ===
In 2017, Gambotto-Burke returned with her daughter to England, where she began working for The Sunday Times, The Telegraph, and other newspapers.

Gambotto-Burke's writing about human trafficking has been syndicated around the world. She is also a widely published essayist, and has written lead and front-page news stories about legal issues, and, in the wake of the Israel-Hamas conflict, antisemitism.

The issues of pornography and gender inequality also heavily feature in Gambotto-Burke's journalism.

As of January 2023, Gambotto-Burke had been writing the back page of The Weekend Australian literary section, and was a senior feature and cover story writer for The Daily Mail and other major newspapers, including The Sunday Times, in London.

== Maternal feminism ==
=== Mama: Love, Motherhood and Revolution ===
Gambotto-Burke dedicated her first book about motherhood, Mama: Love, Motherhood and Revolution to her daughter Bethesda. The foreword was written by the French obstetrician and academic Michel Odent. It immediately went to #1 on Amazon.co.uk.

Gambotto-Burke, a high-profile advocate of increased parent/child intimacy, was a working, breast-feeding SAHM who practised co-sleeping. "The association of maternal–infant separation with developmental havoc is not new, and yet despite the evidence, little change has been made to the way mothers and babies are treated, both by hospitals and by society at large", Gambotto-Burke wrote.

In a Life Matters interview with Natasha Mitchell, Dr. John Irvine described Mama: Love, Motherhood and Revolution as being to motherhood what The Female Eunuch was to feminism, and Professor K. S. Anand, 2009 Nils Rosén von Rosenstein Award laureate and professor of paediatrics, anaesthesiology, perioperative and pain medicine at Stanford University, described it as "undeniably the most important book of the 21st century".

Controversially, Gambotto-Burke also home-schooled her daughter whilst working fulltime. In August 2024, she announced that her daughter had been accepted for an integrated science degree at Oxford University.

=== Apple: Drugs, Sex, Motherhood and the Recovery of the Feminine ===
On publication of Apple: Sex, Drugs, Motherhood and the Recovery of the Feminine, a 3000-word excerpt ran in The Australian. Gambotto-Burke's strong opinions on the routine administration of obstetric anaesthesia attracted significant attention.

In a review of the book, British author and The Daily Telegraph writer Gwyneth Rees wrote, "Argued with intelligence, force and the fury of righteous indignation by lauded feminist thinker, author and critic Antonella Gambotto-Burke, the book explores how the manner in which we enter the world has a profound and lasting impact on our lives, and by extension upon society as a whole. As we come to learn, modern obstetric practices are deeply connected with an increased likelihood in later life of drug use, sexual fetishes, anxiety and mental illness, chronic and potentially life-threatening illnesses. They are also linked with the breakdown of relationships between men and women, and the erosion of the bond between mothers and children. This all comes to light through Apple's central question: why is our culture governed by the principle of separation?"

== Personal life ==
At the age of 22, Gambotto-Burke became engaged to the notorious American-born UK GQ editor Michael VerMeulen. She left VerMeulen in 1990, citing, in The Eclipse: A Memoir of Suicide, his drug abuse as a primary reason. He later died of a cocaine overdose.

After her brother Gianluca, a Macquarie Bank executive, gassed himself in his car at the age of 32, Gambotto-Burke began reading "obsessively" about death and suicide, trying, as she said in a national Australian cover interview, to make sense of the experience, trying to become big enough to let go of my brother. That's what bereavement is about – surrendering the memory, the relationship."

The Eclipse: A Memoir of Suicide (2004) is about her brother's 2001 death and her engagement to, and the death of, VerMeulen. In another interview, she said: "I wanted to explain depression as a valid emotional response rather than as a disease".

On 24 November 2023 Gambotto-Burke and multi-platinum record producer Gavin Monaghan announced their engagement. The two had been working together since late 2022 as Mama ft. Antonella.

== MAMA ft. Antonella ==
From June 2019 to February 2020, Gambotto-Burke hosted The Antonella Show, her own programme on London's independent Boogaloo Radio, which featured guests such as the acclaimed producer and composer Magnus Fiennes, the award-winning sculptor Beth Carter, former PiL bassist Jah Wobble and other internationally recognised artists and writers. She only stopped, she said on air in January 2020, to commence work on Apple: Sex, Drugs, Motherhood and the Recovery of the Feminine.

Gambotto-Burke told the BBC that she started singing in 2021, after lockdown, on the advice of a Grammy-Award-winning producer and former Creation Records CEO Alan McGee.

She founded the band MAMA ft. Antonella with Monaghan in late 2022. Their debut single, the electronic dance track "I Want What I Want", had over 36,000 Spotify streams in the first few weeks. "A River Running Wild", the first single from the first album, was called "revelatory", likened to the work of Nick Cave by critics, and was followed by the single "Some Love".

In a radio interview with Gambotto-Burke, Alan McGee revealed that in her twenties, she had refused his offer of singing with the Jesus and Mary Chain on the basis of "shyness". He said that she is "forever surprising".

Commercial Road / A Call to Light, the opening track of Apex Predators, was, in October and November 2025, #1 for four consecutive weeks on an American independent radio station's international chart, and #5 on a national Canadian indie radio station's annual chart.

"Apex Predators", MAMA ft. Antonella's debut album, was described by critic Kris Needs in Electronic Sound magazine as "a riveting stone killer" and, by critic Chris Bound, as a "thrilling fusion of alt-blues, roadhouse rock, darkwave, and gothic Americana, haunted by the ghosts of Patti Smith, Nick Cave, and Amy Winehouse, yet entirely their own beast. The result is a narcotic swirl of beauty and brutality."

MAMA made the 2026 GRAMMY Awards longlist in two categories - Best Rock Album and Best New Artist on a "zero PR budget" and after only four gigs.

In February 2026, Gambotto-Burke, who co-produced the album in addition to writing the lyrics and melodies, and singing, announced that her band had made the longlist for British Music Producers Guild Awards in three categories: Album of the Year, Self-Producing Artist of the Year, and, for her partner's work on the album, Producer of the Year.

== Bibliography ==
=== Anthologies ===
- An Instinct for the Kill (HarperCollins Australia, 1997)
- Lunch of Blood (Random House Australia, 1994)
- MOUTH (Broken Ankle Digital, 2013)

=== Novel ===
- The Pure Weight of the Heart (Orion, 1998)

=== Memoirs ===
- The Eclipse: A Memoir of Suicide (Broken Ankle Books, 2003)

=== Motherhood ===
- Mama: Dispatches from the Frontline of Love (Arbon, 2014)
- Mama: Love, Motherhood and Revolution (Pinter & Martin, 2015)
- Apple: Sex, Drugs, Motherhood and the Recovery of the Feminine (Pinter & Martin, 2022)

=== As a contributor ===
- Write A Letter to Your Twenty Year Old Self, edited by Kim Chandler McDonald (2020)
- Nick Cave: Sinner, Saint: The True Confessions, 30 Years of Essential Interviews, edited by Mat Snow (Plexus Publishing, 2011)
- My Favourite Teacher, edited by Robert Macklin (University of New South Wales Press, 2011)
- Your Mother Would Be Proud: True Tales of Mayhem and Misadventure, edited by Tamara Sheward and Jenny Valentish (Allen & Unwin, 2009)
- What Is Mother Love?, edited by Selwa Anthony (Penguin, 2008)
- Some Girls Do ... My Life as a Teenager, edited by Jacinta Tynan (Allen & Unwin, 2007)
- The Best Australian Profiles, edited by Matthew Ricketson (Black Inc., 2004)
- The Thoughts of Chairman Stan, by Stan Zemanek (HarperCollins Australia, 1998): afterword by Gambotto-Burke
- Love Cries: Cruel Passions, Strange Desires, edited by Peter Blazey (HarperCollins Australia, 1995)
- This I Believe: 100 Eminent Australians Explore Life's Big Question, edited by John Marsden (Random House Australia, 1996).
- ShrinkLit, edited by Michele Field (Penguin, 1983)

=== Directions/scripts/storyboards ===
- I Could Be Me, directed by David Bromley (artist), narrated by Hugo Weaving (2008)
- Storyboard/direction for I Want What I Want music video by Mama ft. Antonella

=== Television appearances ===
Gambotto-Burke has appeared on many television programs, including Beauty & The Beast (Channel Ten, Foxtel), The Midday Show (Channel 9), Meet the Press (SBS), Wake Up (Channel Ten), Mornings (Channel 9) and performed cameos on Paul Fenech's SBS sitcom Pizza.

=== Album ===
"Apex Predators" (Magic Garden Records x Revolver Records x Warner Music), May 21, 2025

=== Digital singles ===
1. "A River Running Wild", September 20, 2024
2. "Some Love", December 6, 2024
3. "Morning", February 14, 2025

=== Awards ===
1. 2026 Grammy Awards longlist: Best New Artist, Best Rock Album
2. 2026 Music Producers Guild Awards: Album of the Year, Self-Producing Artist of the Year, Producer of the Year

=== Solo projects ===
1. "Promised Land", collaboration with British electronic artist Chris Budd as "Budd vs. Antonella"
