= MAMA ft. Antonella =

British alternative band

- Origin: Wolverhampton, England
- Genres: alternative; blues; rock; singer songwriter
- Years active: 2022–present
- Label: Magic Garden Recordings x Revolver Records x Warner Music
- Members: Antonella Gambotto-Burke; Gavin Monaghan
- Website: mamaftantonella.com

MAMA ft. Antonella are a British alternative band from Wolverhampton, founded in 2022 by writer Antonella Gambotto-Burke and multiplatinum producer Gavin Monaghan. Their 2024 debut single, "A River Running Wild", was self-released.

Apex Predators, their debut album, was released one month after their first gig. Described by critic Kris Needs as "phenomenal", and, in Electronic Sound magazine, as a "riveting stone killer", it has been described as having elements of Robert Johnson and Led Zeppelin.

MAMA ft. Antonella have cited various bands and artists as influences, including Amy Winehouse, Nirvana, Anita Lane, the Sex Pistols, and Nina Simone.

In October 2025, MAMA made the GRAMMY Awards longlist in two categories: Best Rock Album for their debut album Apex Predators and Best New Artist.

== History ==
=== Antonella Gambotto-Burke ===
Antonella Gambotto-Burke was born in Sydney to Northern Italian parents. Her mother was a singer who emigrated to Australia at the age of nineteen; in her youth, she performed on the Australian hit show Bandstand (TV program). Gambotto-Burke's father was a businessman who made the Australian front pages and international legal news when he single-handedly changed Australian corporate law.

At the age of eighteen, Gambotto-Burke left Australia for England, where she worked for the NME and other music magazines.

The following year, the NME was sued over Gambotto-Burke's review of a Cliff Richard gig, Nick Cave wrote a misogynistic song about her after she told the truth of his addiction in a Zig Zag cover interview ("He was actually a horrible person," Gambotto-Burke said in a podcast), Martin Amis made her his (unconsenting) muse for the iconic character, among others, of Nicola Six in London Fields - the letters Amis wrote her now belong to the Harry Ransom Center at the University of Texas, Austin - and, notably, she was befriended by Alan McGee, who would later found Creation Records and discover Oasis.

McGee wanted Gambotto-Burke to sing with the Jesus and Mary Chain, but she was "too shy" and preferred to focus on her writing. "The idea of performing then filled me with terror," Gambotto-Burke said.

She told another interviewer, "I’ve always been really, really shy - not intellectually, but emotionally. Intellectually, I'm fearless. In high school, I was always singing solos - I deeply loved music - but my life hit the wall at 16 when my grandmother, who lived with us, died. She was the most beautiful woman, and her death was drawn-out - cancer - and deeply traumatic. So the singing just stopped. Boom. I started wearing black. The grief was profound."

In late 2019, McGee took her out to dinner in London with a Grammy Award-winning producer, who, over dinner, turned to her. "'You should sing,' he said unprompted. 'The way air moves over your larynx. I work with voices all the time, and you'd be really good.'" Gambotto-Burke said that the producer's tone was so authoritative and Alan "just looked so happy that for the first time in my life, I felt brave enough to try."

A few weeks later, Gambotto-Burke was offered a contract for Apple: Sex, Drugs, Motherhood and the Recovery of the Feminine, which took her 18 months to write. "Then lockdown happened, so it wasn't until late 2021 that I started writing songs."

Monaghan told an interview, "I understand why McGee asked. Antonella's voice is pure emotion and her lyrics are up there with the best – Leonard Cohen, Bob Dylan, you name it."

Beginning to make music was, in its entirety, a "really unexpected" process for Gambotto-Burke, who said in an interview, "I had no idea where I was going or what I was doing – life was shoving me in a new direction, and I finally decided to just roll with it."

In 2025, Gambotto-Burke also announced that she would be launching a podcast called "The Wild Ones", leaking a teaser from her interview with drummer Lol Tolhurst of The Cure.

=== Gavin Monaghan ===
Gavin Monaghan was born in London to a British mother and Irish father. In his youth, he was a reserve in the British Commonwealth Games karate team and supported various bands, including The Cult and Zodiac Mindwarp, playing major stadiums around the world. Gambotto-Burke revealed that he "hated the whole scene - the drugs, the endless tour-bus anal sex loops, the parade of women, the emotional destabilisation."

The first recording studio Monaghan founded was Clockwork in London.

Monaghan, who has worked on 30+ gold and platinum records, has since worked with Robert Plant, Led Zeppelin, Elvis Presley estate, Duane Eddy estate, Grace Jones, Editors, Paolo Nutini, Aurora, The Twang, The Holloways, Ocean Colour Scene, Tony Christie, The Cult, Sly and Robbie, Jimmy Somerville, Aswad, Elvis Costello, Terry Hall, Kirsty MacColl, Femi Kuti, Meredith Brooks, Goldblade, Nizlopi, Scott Matthews, Lemmy, The Destroyers, Stone, Headshrinkers, The Sherlocks, The Blinders, House of the Dragon's Paddy Considine, and JAWS, among hundreds of others.

His music is featured in innumerable advertisements and multimillion-dollar productions ranging from the Austin Powers and Twilight franchises to American Horror Story, Gangs of London, Luther, and Peaky Blinders. BBC presenter Robin Valk said that Monaghan "commands massive respect worldwide".

Similarly, BBC and Rolling Stone writer Susan Hansen said of Monaghan's studio, "This place is called Magic Garden for a reason. Extraordinary records continue to be made here and the level of creativity that goes into it really is something else. A fascination with and a need for contrast and balance might hold the key to understanding what Magic Garden is about. But whether that holds the key to getting to know the studio's owner and founder, producer legend and mixer extraordinaire Gavin Monaghan, who works there, remains a question to be answered."

In 2024, Monaghan was commissioned by Robert Plant to "reimagine" two Led Zeppelin tracks, Kashmir and Whole Lotta Love, for the Wolverhampton Wanderers football team.

Monaghan is a two-time winner of the BMA Producer of the Year and his studio, Magic Garden, is a two-time winner of the BMA Studio of the Year Awards (2019, 2022/23).

"I’ve represented and supported other people's art for decades and continue to do so with infinite love, but exploring my own art without any commercial pressure has been exhilarating," Monaghan told MSN News. "The fact that Antonella is such a phenomenal singer and lyricist has made the process super easy."

=== 2022–2025: Band beginnings and MAMA ft. Antonella ===
Gambotto-Burke first met Monaghan at his studio, Magic Garden, when she went in to record the first single by her first band. After a 16-hour stint in the studio, she decided, on Monaghan's advice, to dissolve the band. "I was devastated – I'd worked on that song for months," Gambotto-Burke told an interviewer. "Gavin wanted me to change genres on the basis that I needed a 'bigger framework' for my voice. So we decided to go with dance, which we both madly love."

Gambotto-Burke's first experience of Monaghan was intimidating. "The issue was that I had almost no confidence in my singing. Add this to the fact that I'd lost my voice from nerves two or so weeks earlier and you can imagine my terror. There I was with a multi-platinum award-winning Irish-British producer who has Robert Plant dropping in for tea and who has worked with some of the finest musicians in the world, and I was dying."

MAMA ft. Antonella released two "Berlin techno/punk nouveau" tracks - "I Want What I Want", which had them lauded as "the most dynamic outfit to hit the scene in years", and "Real Girl", described by a reviewer as a "poetic call to arms", but the tracks disappeared from all platforms after the announcement that the band was going acoustic.

"We can fight when we work because we’re both used to running the show," Gambotto-Burke said. "On one occasion, we almost broke up – in retrospect, this was very funny. He said, 'Right! Go! You can walk to the station!' And I said, 'Fine! But I'll catch a cab!' And then we both started laughing, went out for Chinese, and returned to the studio."

"Morning", which would be released on February 14, 2025 as the third self-released single from the album, was MAMA ft. Antonella's first acoustic track to be played on BBC Radio. On its release, it went to #2 on the global Indie Radio Alliance Chart.

The name "MAMA" was coined by Monaghan as an homage to Gambotto-Burke's first polemic on motherhood, Mama: Love, Motherhood and Revolution. He told an interviewer, "A few years ago, Antonella wrote a magnificent book called Mama:_Love,_Motherhood_and_Revolution, and I thought it would be fantastic band name for an affirmatively female-fronted band. It's so her."

Gambotto-Burke has spoken of the difficulty of evolving as a musician while homeschooling as a single mother with sole custody in Folkestone (Monaghan could not leave Wolverhampton because of his studio). Because they lived in different counties until 2025, MAMA couldn't perform live before then.

Identified as a vocal feminist, Gambotto-Burke is an advocate for the redefinition of feminine value in our culture. "It's critically important for the collective soul to honour the experiences of older women, rather than reflexively trivialising them or limiting them to an artistic ghetto," she said. "Fertility is not the only value for a woman. Maturity can be a terrifying - and a terrifyingly beautiful - landscape."

She has written of the poverty she and her daughter, who is now a science student at Oxford University, endured while she was working long-distance on the album with Monaghan. "My daughter and I were living in a rented, six-flight-walk-up attic flat next door to a heroin halfway house. We had no TV, and had never owned a car. Most of our books were second hand and our clothes vintage. We did all our shopping by bicycle. I still cry remembering the Christmas Eve a cashier (nameplate: Peachy) paid for our groceries when my card was rejected at the till."

In October and November 2025, MAMA ft. Antonella was #1 for four consecutive weeks on an American indie radio station chart, and was voted #5 on a national Canadian indie radio annual chart.

Prior to their inclusion in the 2026 GRAMMY Awards longlist for Best New Artist and Best Rock Album, MAMA had only played five gigs - four festivals and one sold-out gig supporting S E N S E S. MAMA was longlisted in February 2026 for the British Music Producers Guild Awards in three categories: Album of the Year, Self-Producing Artist of the Year, and, for Monaghan, Producer of the Year.

== Members ==
Current members

- Antonella Gambotto-Burke – lead and backing vocals, lyrics, melodies, executive production (2022–present)
- Gavin Monaghan – backing music, all instruments, production (2022–present)

== Discography ==
=== Studio albums ===
"Apex Predators", Magic Garden Records x Revolver Records x Warner Music, May 21, 2025
