= The Eclipse: A Memoir of Suicide =

2004 book by Antonella Gambotto-Burke

- Author: Antonella Gambotto-Burke
- Language: English
- Genre: Memoir
- Publisher: Broken Ankle Books
- Publication date: 2004
- Publication place: Australia
- Media type: Print (Paperback and, in translation, Hardback). Ebook released in 2013.
- Pages: 205 pp (first edition, paperback)
- ISBN: 0-9751075-1-8 (first edition, paperback)
- Dewey Decimal: 828/.9203 22
- LC Class: PR9619.4.G36 Z465 2003
- Preceded by: The Pure Weight of the Heart
- Followed by: MOUTH

The Eclipse: A Memoir of Suicide (ISBN 0-9751075-1-8) is Antonella Gambotto-Burke's first memoir and fourth book. The narrative details her response to the death of her ex-fiancé, the notorious American-born British GQ editor Michael VerMeulen, and to her younger brother Gianluca's 2001 suicide, and led to Gambotto-Burke being featured on the cover of The Weekend Australian review section.

In 2023, poet Kimmo Leijala wrote of the Finnish edition, "At times, The Eclipse: A Memoir of Suicide reads like a strict, even self-critical monologue involving reflection and existential questions ... [Gambotto-Burke]'s use of language reads like poetry at times, drawing the reader in. At other times, her prose makes my heart pound ... this is a book everyone should read. As the back cover says, it's 'the most important book ever written about loss'."

The Eclipse has been published in four languages.

== Biographical ==
Gambotto-Burke has said that she could not save her brother from himself, and wrote that the only way she could deal with the onslaught of grief was by regulating her life.

"For those who dismiss the 3000-year-old practice [of yoga] on spiritual grounds or because of its associations with new age guff: yoga is now part of all pro-athlete training ..." Gambotto-Burke wrote. "As I found after my brother’s death, consistent yoga practice also creates dramatic increases in the level of serotonin, a key player in the mediation of happiness, optimism and satisfaction."

== Reception ==
"When they were both five, a blond boy with 'rueful eyes' asked Gambotto to marry him; at 16, he blew his brains out," The Sunday Times critic wrote. "Later, her lover, Michael VerMeulen, the editor of GQ magazine, overdosed on cocaine. Then in 2001, her brother gassed himself in a car. He left an apologetic note to his unknown discoverers, reassuring them that the gas was not explosive and asking the police to return the rented empty tank to the shop. He thought of everything - yet his family and friends were left only with a terrible perplexity. [Gambotto-Burke]'s account is intense and moving, and she vividly captures her brother's troubled character."

In The South China Morning Post, Annabel Walker decided that the book was "[h]onest, moving and reflective" and that "at its heart is intense grief." Gambotto-Burke "presents the hard facts, showing that during the past 45 years suicide rates worldwide have increased by 60 per cent ... [a] comfortingly honest account of the hellishness and black humour such events can bring ... Throughout the book, Gambotto asks: Does any man have the right to dispose of his own life? She supplies conflicting theories of philosophers and thinkers from Plato to the present ... She finds that the answer is no."

British philosophy professor Nicholas Humphrey wrote, "I read The Eclipse through at one sitting, gripped as by Coleridge's Ancient Mariner. It's an astonishing, deep and beautiful book."

The American Association of Suicidology magazine summarised the book thus: "The Eclipse is recommended for anyone searching for the meaning of loss in his/her life.'"

The Eclipse: A Memoir of Suicide is also recommended by the Good Grief Trust.

Psychiatrist Béla Buda, on the American Psychological Association website, described The Eclipse as "brilliant".
