= Mama: Love, Motherhood and Revolution =

2015 book by Antonella Gambotto-Burke

- Author: Antonella Gambotto-Burke
- Language: English
- Genre: Parenthood, feminism, culture
- Publisher: Pinter & Martin UK
- Publication date: 7 July 2015 (World English)
- ISBN: 978-1780662053
- Preceded by: Mouth
- Followed by: Apple: Sex, Drugs, Motherhood and the Recovery of the Feminine

Antonella Gambotto-Burke's first influential work of nonfiction about motherhood, Mama: Love, Motherhood and Revolution is an anthology of personal essays and interviews with some of the world's leading experts on family and childcare, including Sheila Kitzinger, Steve Biddulph, Stephanie Coontz, Gabor Maté, and others.

A number of the essays were previously published in different editions of Vogue and Elle. Professor Michel Odent wrote the foreword.

Identified as one of the most empowering feminist quotes of all time, the book's most famous line is, "Life without femininity - devoid of mystery, emotion, gentleness and the unerring power of a woman's love - is no life at all."

== Core theories ==
In a piece for The Australian, Gambotto-Burke wrote, "The most compelling evidence for attachment parenting was the discovery that the brain is only 20 per cent or so complete at birth; the rest is physically formed by the child’s experience of love or of its absence. Love literally creates the neural pathways responsible for happiness, calmness, closeness, co-operation, self-regulation. In particular, the second six months of life, known as the 'bonding window' to psychologists, are critical to the child’s future ability to sustain relationships."

Gambotto-Burke believes that the breakdown in the maternal/child relationship is evidenced by "the increasingly obvious - and tragic - lessening of territorial maternal behaviour towards the infant."

In a cover story interview, Gambotto-Burke noted, "The kinds of pressures we exert [on children] are very different [to the Tiger Mother Syndrome] – expecting children to flourish without attention, punishing children for not complying, exposing children to all manner of unsuitable material and then bewailing their behavioural problems ... The greatest disservice parents do themselves and their children is living life at a crazy pace. We all need to slow down. We need to turn off our radios and televisions and PCs and just learn to be with our children. We need to listen to and take pleasure in them. Childhood is a garden, not a series of developmental stages."

== Reception ==
Kanwaljeet S. Anand, Professor of Pediatrics and of Anaesthesiology, Perioperative and Pain Medicine at Stanford University School of Medicine and the 2009 Nils Rosén von Rosenstein Award from the Swedish Academy of Medicine is quoted on the dustjacket:

"I could not have predicted the profound impact of Mama. While making rounds in the paediatric ICU after reading it, I insisted that the entire team go into the patient's room, so that the mother did not have to leave her child's bedside. Later in the morning, I became irritated when a senior ICU nurse interposed herself between a mother and her baby - obstructing the mother's attempts to calm her baby down during the removal of a breathing tube. Clinicians like me have constantly disarticulated the mother-infant dyad, dismembered the family dynamic that is crucial to healing and health, and imposed inviolate rules and polices to justify this insanity. No more of this, at least in my practice, will be tolerated."

On the basis of her insight, Gambotto-Burke was invited by the British Association of Radical Midwives to address their "Hands Off Midwifery" Conference in late 2023.

The American psychiatrist and bestselling author Peter Breggin said of Mama: Love, Motherhood and Revolution, "This deeply inspiring and informing book about the empathetic connection between mother and child reminds us of how much we need to nurture both mothers and children in their crucial role of advancing humankind."

In The Weekend Australian, author Jack Marx found that Mama: Love, Motherhood and Revolution "brings the mystery of motherhood up close and personal. Having lost a brother to suicide and mother to a 'corrosive relationship' that seems as good as dead, Gambotto-Burke watched her own daughter marvel at her first dawn and found it 'the most exquisite moment of my life' ... but this is the experience of motherhood: personal, magical, sublimely powerful, and medical jargon can take a hike. Gambotto-Burke's point is that the shared experiences of mothers are of a value no PhD can match."

In The South China Morning Post, critic Bron Sibree writes, "[Gambotto-Burke] points out that 'throughout history the most brutal cultures have always been distinguished by mother-infant separation', and cites a litany of ways in which the maternal-child attachment is being eroded in our times, and with it our capacity to love and be loved. She reports [Michel] Odent's belief that oxytocin, the hormone of love, fundamental to birth and bonding throughout life, is growing weaker and with catastrophic results. 'Our culture has come to be defined by adrenaline,' she opines. But then, chilling facts and controversial ideas are seamed into this offering as measuredly and as purposely as are the lists of tips for mothers. Disagree with the thrust of one of her wellcrafted sentences, and you'll find your heart pierced by another."

The excerpt of Mama: Love, Motherhood and Revolution published in The Guardian (UK), went viral.
