= Ferguson reflex =

Cycle of uterine contractions

The Ferguson reflex (not to be confused with the foetal ejection reflex) is the neuroendocrine reflex comprising the self-sustaining cycle of uterine contractions initiated by pressure at the cervix, more precisely, the internal end of cervix, or vaginal walls. It is an example of positive feedback in biology. The Ferguson reflex occurs in mammals.

== Mechanism ==
Upon application of pressure to the internal end of the cervix, oxytocin is released (therefore increase in contractile proteins), which stimulates uterine contractions, which in turn increases pressure on the cervix (thereby increasing oxytocin release, etc.), until the baby is delivered.

Sensory information regarding mechanical stretch of the cervix is carried in a sensory neuron, which synapses in the dorsal horn before ascending to the brain in the anterolateral columns (ipsilateral and contralateral routes). Via the medial forebrain bundle, the efferent reaches the PVN and SON of the hypothalamus. The posterior pituitary releases oxytocin due to increased firing in the hypothalamo-hypophyseal tract. Oxytocin acts on the myometrium, on receptors which have been upregulated by a functional increase of the estrogen-progesterone ratio. This functional ratio change is mediated by a decrease in myometrial sensitivity to progesterone, due to a decrease in progesterone receptor A, and a concurrent increase in myometrial sensitivity to estrogen, due to an increase in estrogen receptor α. This causes myometrial contraction and further positive feedback on the reflex.

In their studies among mice, Niles Newton and colleagues demonstrated the importance of cortical influences. They enlarged the topic by introducing the term fetus ejection reflex.

The concept of cortical influences provided reasons to raise questions about the process of parturition among humans, characterized by a high encephalization quotient. Michel Odent had observed that women can experience such a reflex, characterized by a birth after a short series of irresistible and powerful contractions without any room for voluntary movements, resulting in a painless birth.

For such a hormonal cascade to occur requires a sufficient sense of psychological safety, as occurs in normal or undisturbed birth. The higher the intervention rate, such as induction or caesarian section, the lower the likelihood of the Ferguson Reflex occurring. In contrast, the lower the incidence of intervention, such as is found in those countries with high rate of home births, and birth centers worldwide, the higher the likelihood of the Ferguson Reflex occurring. This may explain the lack of research, considering the public health benefits of such education to both hospitals and the general public.
