= An Instinct for the Kill =

- Author: Antonella Gambotto-Burke (Antonella Gambotto)
- Language: English
- Genre: Essays, literary criticism, interviews, celebrity
- Publisher: HarperCollins Australia
- Publication date: 1997
- Publication place: Australia
- Media type: Print (Paperback)
- ISBN: 0-7322-5891-X
- Preceded by: Lunch of Blood
- Followed by: The Pure Weight of the Heart

An Instinct for the Kill (ISBN 0-7322-5891-X) is the second of Antonella Gambotto-Burke's books and her second anthology. It was dedicated to investment banker Mark Burrows. In his introduction to the book, Edward de Bono writes: "Antonella is not afraid of words, ideas, her own opinions or the opinions of others. Perception is personal so truth is also personal. This is much more like Protagoras than like Plato. For Protagoras, perception was the only truth – but it was changeable. For Plato, the fascist, truth was what you had reached when you thought it was the absolute."

An Instinct for the Kill also features interviews with Tori Amos, Jeffrey Archer, Flavio Briatore and the Benetton Formula One team, Deepak Chopra, Jerry Hall, Charlton Heston, Princess Haya bint al-Hussein (daughter of Hussein of Jordan), Erica Jong, Colleen McCullough, Gene Simmons of Kiss, and others.

== Critical response ==
In her review of the book, Australian author Tegan Bennett described Gambotto as "one of the most exciting writers and interviewers it has ever been my luck to read," and "the MENSA mannequin, a shit-stirrer, a show-off, a fearless, funny, beautiful woman who never sticks to the rules." Above all else, Bennett concludes, Gambotto "seems to value honesty, which is why Warwick and Joanne Capper are treated with such affection." In The Age, Australian author Fiona Capp was more critical, concluding that Gambotto is "a perfect pussycat with those she admires", although she felt that Gambotto's other subjects "often do half the job of damning themselves."

== Quotations ==
Tori Amos: "After this period of failure and rejection, I began chasing success. At that point it became more important for me to make it than to be a musician. I had lost faith in my work. Instead of telling myself that approval was irrelevant and that all that mattered was the truth of my expression, I became desperate.'"

Jeffrey Archer: "'The English don't welcome success; this is the result of centuries of understating everything. They don't let themselves go! They're all pent up inside! ... BALLS!' he suddenly explodes."

Warwick Capper: "They see the situation simply enough: quid pro quo, and hold the mustard. Like two creations of a contemporary Twain, they are both innocent and wily, delightful and lewd, crude and charming. Warwick may well be an intellectual savannah, but the surfeit of tenderness in Joanne's every look transcends the cold opportunism of which she has been accused. The more sophisticated amongst us probably have something to learn from their unpretentious joy."

Jerry Hall: "The minute (Mick Jagger) gets home, ah say: Right! Back to real life! The way everyone treats him, you know? Everywhere he goes it's front page news; everyone wants to meet him; they're all waitin' outside his hotel; huge bouquets of flowers arrive every minute ... it's ridiculous! But ah think he likes it."

Charlton Heston: "'A lot of these girls were treated just shittily by producers and studio heads and husbands, you know? And then there was the starfuck syndrome. It was just appalling. Rita Hayworth is another example. They were all just terribly abused by the profession.'"

Erica Jong: "'I don't think I've ever been to an orgy,' she says, suddenly – and surprisingly – shy. And then, in the soft, disappointed tones of a woman who deplores her hostess' taste in china, she says: 'Jon and I went to Plato's Retreat [a defunct New York sex club], which was so awful. We said: We've gotta do this! Are we cultural reporters or ain't we? Let's go! So we went into the mat room, and there were all these sweaty, greasy people with pimples – it was totally anti-erotic, it was just a crock. Jon couldn't get it up, and I can't blame him. There was scum on the water in the hot tub!'"

Gene Simmons of Kiss: "At the age of twelve, Gene was studying to be a rabbi at a theological seminary. He and his divorced Hungarian mother were living in a New York ghetto. 'I remember looking out the window one day,' he says, 'and there was this Spanish girl with long, black, THICK hair all the way down to her butt.' The young rabbi-in-training watched as this girl jumped rope, his eyes hanging out of his head. 'Whenever she jumped,' he says with relish, 'it looked like her hair was slapping her butt, and it was the most remarkably erotic thing I've ever seen.'"
