= Lunch of Blood =

1994 book by Antonella Gambotto-Burke

- The original 1994 Australian Lunch of Blood paperback cover
- Author: Antonella Gambotto
- Language: English
- Genre: Interviews
- Publisher: Random House
- Publication date: 1994
- Publication place: Australia
- Media type: Paperback
- Pages: 363
- ISBN: 0-09-182871-6
- Followed by: An Instinct for the Kill

Lunch of Blood is Antonella Gambotto-Burke's first book and first anthology. The title was inspired by a Saul Bellow poem:

"Mice hide when hawks are high;
Hawks shy from airplanes;
Planes dread the ack-ack-ack;
Each one fears somebody.
Only the heedless lions
Under the Booloo tree
Snooze in each other's arms
After their lunch of blood -
I call that living good!"

Published by Random House in 1994, Lunch of Blood was dedicated to the artist and critic John Henshaw, and includes Gambotto-Burke's 1991 Independent on Sunday cover story on British cardiothoracic surgeons ("Affairs of the Heart"), and interviews with Martin Amis, Edward de Bono, Gérard Depardieu, Alex Dimitriades, Ben Elton, Rachel Hunter, Elle Macpherson, Morrissey, Marc Newson, Noah Taylor, Naomi Wolf, and others. It peaked at number four on The Sydney Morning Herald's bestseller lists and, according to a review section cover story in The Weekend Australian, established Gambotto-Burke's reputation as the "Stilettoed Assassin".

== Critical response ==
The Canberra Times critic explained, "Geoffrey Wheatcroft called their tool of trade 'the killer interview'. Mark Lawson christened the movement 'jugular journalism'. It was like a bullfight, he said. 'Fifteen hundred words flash by, a succession of passes with the muleta, and then comes estocada, and another carcass is dragged away by the mule-team' ... [Gambotto is] one of our matador-interviewers." Australian Bookseller & Publisher concurred: "The interviews hang together superbly as a collection, largely because Gambotto has … the astonishing ability to reveal the absolute essence of a person." And in The Sydney Morning Herald, Don Anderson described Gambotto-Burke in interviewer mode as "a Tinker Bell among the pirates, sprinkling fairy dust in the eyes of celebrity crocodiles ...," and concluded: "Never let it be said that Michael Douglas's line in Wall Street, 'Lunch is for wimps', could apply to her."

== Quotations ==
Martin Amis: "Established authors often speak of the 'coldness' of novelists, a coldness purported to be necessary for the documenting process. Amis is not enthralled by the topic, narrows his pale eyes, lights another cigarette, and smokes it for a minute before speaking. 'You’re certainly not one removed from your emotions, but a fraction of a removal away. You do have this sort of vampiric attitude to experience.'"

Edward de Bono: "'I find everything beautiful, everything,’ he says. 'I am very much against the notion that for something to be beautiful, it has to be in a frame in an art gallery with someone reviewing it. Beauty may be the elegance of a mathematical solution, it can be a Penthouse centrefold, design, a rainy day ... anything.'"

Cardiothoracic surgeons: "Allen suddenly slices a straight line down the woman’s chest with his scalpel, through the plastic. A jewel-bright bar of blood bubbles up. the sticky plastic holds the skin in place. He begins burning the slight aperture with an electrosurgical generator - a bolt of energy which cauterizes bleeding vessels. His face is calm. The fumes rising from the flesh are thick and foul and curl into the faces of those watching. Burning flesh has the stench of burning rubber, burning hair."

Nick Cave: "'I’m not really interested in the audience’s enjoyment,’ Cave mumbles once he has changed into his clean trousers. 'It doesn't bother me one way or another. I just don't give a shit. People feel more and more disappointed with each concert because less and less happens. It's really easy to suck an audience in. like I can wiggle my bum and backflip on my head and they love it. I could make an audience love me until the end of my days. There's no point in it any more. I wish they’d just ... die.'"

Ben Elton: "'A single American stealth bomber costs five hundred million American dollars, and they are going to build one hundred and twenty of them. And then they turn around and complain about aid packages! Now that's the kind of obscenity we accept in our lives, and yet none of us can stand being in the lavatory and hearing the splash next door.'"

Rachel Hunter: "'There's this thing people say that the child won't know its mother if it has a nanny and that's rubbish! I know dogs and babies are different, and I had a Great Dane at home in Auckland, and I left her when she was quite young because I had to go back to England for months, and she knew who I was when I got back!'"

Elle Macpherson: "'However, men are men and women are women. That's all there is to it. women who want to be men and men who want to be women are not, to me, particularly normal. I am a woman. I get my periods every month. I get premenstrual tension. I have babies, I like to wear skirts, I like to have men open the door for me and stand up for me when I enter a room. I have absolutely noooo ambition to wear overalls and to have somebody talk to me about some girl that he fucked last night.'"

Morrissey: "'People tell me that they fall in love with me, but I sit at home, night after night, watching television documentaries, and I ask myself: Where are all these people who are falling in love with me? And, you know, I'm stroking the cat ... I'm buttering a large piece of brown toast ... I'm asking myself whether or not I really have anything at all to do with youth culture ... it's very curious.'"
