= Simon Holdin =

Russian oncologist

Simon A. Holdin was Russian Empire-born clinician-oncologist (Russian: Семен Абрамович Холдин; 26.12.1896, Odessa - 1975, Leningrad).

He was graduated in 1919 from Odessa National Medical University (then Medical Faculty of the Novorossiyskiy State University in Odessa [5]) as a Doctor of Medicine.

From 1923 to 1926 he worked as Lecturer at the Odessa Anatomical Pathology Institute and conducted experimental studies on chemical factors of carcinogenesis.

From 1926 till his last days in 1975 he was with the Department of breast tumors in the Institute for Oncology Research (Russian: НИИ Онкологии ) in Saint Petersburg, at the beginning as a surgeon, and his last decades as a Head of the Department.

During the period from 1931 to 1953 he worked also on the Oncology Department in the LenGIDUV (Leningrad Institute for Advanced Medical Education): starting as an assistant, then Docent, then primary teacher (1935) and from 16.11.1944: Head of Department.

He has developed many clinical techniques, including the method of closed electrosurgical resection and anastomosis in the gastrointestinal tract, extended radical intervention in the treatment of breast cancer, the electrosurgical technique for removing breast infiltrative forms of cancer.

His monograph "Cancer of the rectum" (1955) became a handbook for oncology surgeons.

Together with N.N. Petrov, S.A. Holdin was one of the founders and organizers of the USSR Scientific Society of Oncologists and the Leningrad Scientific Society of Oncologists. For 19 years he remained permanent chairman of the latter.

During the Siege of Leningrad in 1941-1944 did not leave the city, continued to work as a surgeon, was wounded.

He died in 1975 and was buried at the cemetery Komarovskoe.
