= Valentyn Serdyuk =

Ukrainian scientist

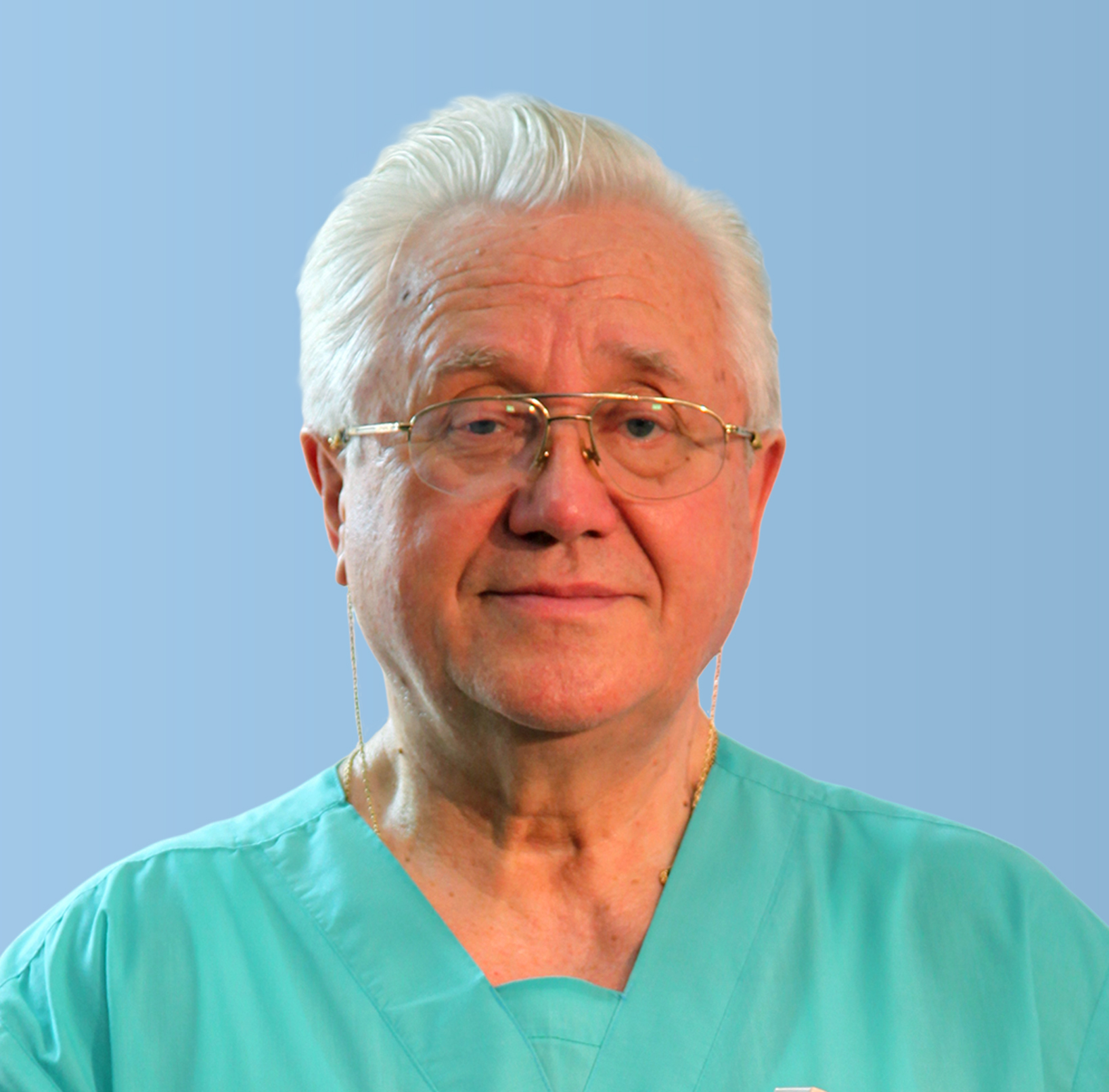
- Born: July 9, 1942; Mykolayiv, Ukrainian SSR, Soviet Union
- Died: September 24, 2021 (aged 79); Odesa, Ukrainian
- Education: Odessa National Medical University
- Known for: physiotherapy (magneto-acoustic therapy), scoliosis
- Awards: Honored Inventor of Ukraine
- Scientific career
- Fields: Medicine, Orthopedic Surgery, scoliosis, physiotherapy (magneto-acoustic therapy), scoliosis in children
- Workplaces: Prof MD Odessa National Medical University; City Clinical Hospital
- Website: https://orto-serdyuk.site

Valentyn Serdyuk (July 9, 1942 – September 24, 2021) was a Ukrainian scientist, honored inventor, and Prof MD of Traumatology and Orthopedic Surgery in Odesa National Medical University.

== Education ==
In 1966, after graduating from Odessa Medical Institute (now ONMedU), he earned his medical degree "with honors". In 1975, he defended his PhD, M.D., Professor of Medicine thesis, and in 1986 — his Ph.D.

== Career ==
Serdyuk developed new medical tools, treatments and devices, earning 40 patents and 72 certificates for innovation. He is the creator of a new approach to surgical treatment of patients with injuries of big joints, complicated with purulent infection, using physiotherapy (magneto-acoustic therapy).

== Recognition ==
In 1982, he received the honorary title "Honored inventor of Ukraine". Between 1987 and 1989 he was awarded one gold, two silver and two bronze medals of Exhibition of Achievements of the National Economy of the USSR. In 1993, he was elected an academician of the Ukrainian Academy of Original Ideas.

In vertebrology, dedicated to scoliosis, he discovered the mechanism of its development and developed a highly conservative method of treatment of children and teenagers.

The effectiveness of the treatment of gunshot wounds to the extremities with purulent complications and venous ulcers, including diabetic origin, was enhanced through the use of magnetic devices.

In 1995, he received a diploma for scientific discovery in vertebrology number HB 1, issued by the Ukrainian International Academy of Original Ideas. The name of the discovery was: "Dependence of diseases of adults from spinal deformity in childhood".

In 2008, he received a second diploma for scientific discovery in vertebrology number HB 5. The name of the discovery was: "The regularity of formation of scoliotic spinal deformity from instability in all its departments related to asymmetric function of the cerebral hemispheres".

The book Scoliosis and spinal pain syndrome: new understanding of their origin and ways of successful treatment is in the library of:

- The Library of the Royal College of Surgeons
- The Library of the British Scoliosis Association (London)
- The British Library
- Library of Congress
- The National Library of Medicine (Bethesda, N.Y., USA)
- The Library of the Medical University "Charite"

== Publications ==
Professor V. Serdyuk is the author and co-author of 248 publications, including 10 books:

- «Восстановительная хирургия деструктивных форм костно-суставного туберкулеза и остеомиелита и их последствий», Киев, 2002. − 504 с. (соавтор).
- «Магнитотерапия. Прошлое. Настоящее. Будущее» (справочное пособие), Киев, 2004, − 536 с.
- «Травматология и ортопедия» (учебное пособие для студентов), 2004, — 288 с. (в соавторстве).
- «Современная магнитотерапия (новые технологии и аппараты)», Пермь, 2005.- 179 с. (в соавторстве)
- «Traumatology and orthopedics» (guidance to the practical studies for students), Odessa, 2006. — 248 p. (as coauthor).
- «Асимметрия тела. Сколиоз. Спинальный болевой синдром. Новый взгляд на старую проблему». Донецк, 2010. — 392 с.
- «Scoliosis and spinal pain syndrome. New understanding of their origin and ways of successful treatment», Delhi, India, 2014. — 406 p.
- "Магнитотерапия. Прошлое. Настоящее. Будущее." Энциклопедия в двух томах. / В.В.Сердюк: [моногр.]. Том 1- LAP Lambert Academic Publishing. Mauritius/- 2019, - 602 P.
- "Магнитотерапия.Прошлое. Настоящее. Будущее." Энциклопедия в двух томах. / В.В.Сердюк: [моногр.]. Том 2 – LAP Lambert Academic Publishing. Mauritius /- 2019, -455 P.
- «Асимметрия тела. Сколиоз. Спинальный болевой синдром» (издание 3-е, дополненное и переработанное). Одесса, 2020. — 167 с.

Articles:

- Serdyuk Valentyn Viktorovich http://journalcmpr.com/issues/idiopathic-scoliosis-mechanisms-its-development / Idiopathic scoliosis. mechanisms of its development / Published: Feb 2, 2022
- Serdyuk Valentyn Viktorovich https://medscidiscovery.com/index.php/msd/article/view/627 / Idiopathic scoliosis. Mechanisms of development / Published: Dec 1, 2021
- Сердюк В. Сухин Ю. В. О природе возникновения различных заболеваний человека и их связи с деформациями позвоночника / В. Сухин Ю. Сердюк // Научный вестник Международного гуманитарного университета. Сэр. : Медицина. Фармация. — 2012. — Вып. 3. — С. 4–10.
- Сердюк В. В. О закономерности формирования сколиотической деформации позвоночника / В. Сердюк, Ю. Н. Свинарев // Научный вестник Международного гуманитарного университета. Сэр. : Медицина. Фармация. — 2011. — Вып. 2. — С. 38–56.
- Сердюк В.В. О природе спинального болевого синдрома у ортопедических больных и его комплексном лечении. / В.В.Сердюк. // Винахідник України No. 1-2 /2015-2017/- C. 93–99.
- Serdyuk V.V. New effective nonsurgical treatment of early onset scoliosis (EOS) by restoration of physiologically correct biomechanics of spinal muscles. Report to 37-th SICOT Orthopedic World Congress. 8–10 September 2016, Rome, Italy.
- Cердюк В.В., Сухин Ю.В. Роль асимметрии тела человека в развитии идиопатического сколиоза и заболеваний внутренних органов. Их связь с нарушением биомеханики позвоночника и таза. – Материалы VI міжнародної науково-практичної конференції «Особливості лікування поєднаної травми в особливий період». м.Одеса, 5-6 травня 2016 р
- Сердюк В.В. Спинальный болевой синдром. Причины его развития.- Збірник наукових праць XVII з`їзду ортопедів-травматологів України (5-7 жовтня). К. 2016, с.301-302.
- Сердюк В.В., Сухин Ю.В., Гай Л.А. Нестабильность крестцовых позвлонков- ведущая причина развития люмбаго. /В.В.Сердюк, Ю.В.Сухин, Л.А.Гай // Вісник морської медицини, No. 2, 2016, с.142-148.
- Сердюк В.В. О природе спинального болевого синдрома /Украинский журнал боли // В.В. Сердюк В.В.: No. 1(5), 2016, с. 43–44.
- Сердюк В.В., Свинарев Ю.Н. О закономерности формирования бокового (сколиотического ) искривления позвоночника / В.В.Сердюк, Ю.Н.Свинарев// Винахідник України / 2, 2016, с.109-127.
- Сердюк В.В. О природе возникновения различных заболеваний человека и их связи с деформациями позвоночника/В.В.Сердюк //Винахідник України/ 2, 2016, c. 128–134.
- Сердюк В.В., Сухин Ю.В., Гай Л.А. Сучасні методи викладання медичних дисціплин у вищій школі / В.В.Сердюк, Ю.В.Сухин, Л.А.Гай //Медична освіта /, No. 1, 2016, с.15-18.
- Сердюк В.В. Асимметрия тела- ведущая причина развития идиопатического сколиоза / В.В.Сердюк // Матеріали XVII з`їзду ортопедів-травматологів України /5-7 жовтня 2016 р.- с.261.
- Сердюк В.В., Бодня А.И. Спинальный болевой синдром. Причины его развития / В.В.Сердюк, А.И.Бодня // Матеріали XVII з` їзду ортопедів- травматологів України / 5-7 жовтня 2016 р.- с. 301–302.
- Сердюк В.В. Новое в понимании этиологии и патогенеза идиопатического сколиоза / В.В.Сердюк // Вестник морской медицины, No.2, 2016, с. 144–142.
- Сердюк В.В. О природе спинального болевого синдрома у ортопедических больных и его комплексное лечение / В.В.Сердюк //Винахідник України, No. 1-2-2015-2017, с.93-99.
- Сердюк В.В. Патент Китая No. zl 201280063101/2/ “Child seat device for a child and stroller” / January 11, 2017.
- Сердюк В.В. Патент Кореи No. 10-1684475 “Child seat device for a child and stroller” / January 2, 2017.
- Сердюк В.В.,Сухин Ю.В. Роль асимметрии тела в нарушении биомеханики позвоночно-тазового сегмента / В.В.Сердюк, Ю.В.Сухин // 2-й УКРАЇНСЬКИЙ СИМПОЗІУМ З БІОМЕХАНІКИ ОПОРНО-РУХОВОЇ СИСТЕМИ «Актуальні питання сучасної ортопедії та травматології», 17-18 вересня 2015 року, Дніпропетровськ. С.78-79.
- Сердюк В.В., Сухин Ю.В., Бодня А.И. Некоторые аспекты лечения подтаранных вывихов стопы / В.В.Сердюк, Ю.В.Сухин, А.И.Бодня //Матеріали науково- практичної конференції з міжнародною участю «Нові технології в ортопедії та травматології», 26 жовтня 2018 року, Одеса, С.29-30.
- Сердюк В.В. Новое в понимании этиологии и патогенеза идиопатического сколиоза /В.В.Сердюк //Матеріали науково-практичної конференції з міжнародною участю «Нові технології в ортопедії та травматології», 26 жовтня 2018 року, Одеса, С.18-19.
- Serdyuk V.V. Magneto-acoustic therapy (VTH) – effective, alternative to antibiotics method of prophylaxis and treatment of purulent complications of battlefield injuries /V.V.Serdyuk // Матеріали XVIII з`їзду ортопедів-травматологів України, 9-11 жовтня 2019 року, м. Івано-Франківськ, С.31-32.
- Сердюк В.В. «Спосіб хірургічного відновлення функціювання нижніх кінцівок при їх в’ялому паралічі, що стався завдяки пораненням спиного мозку травматичного або запального походження (поліомієліт)». УКРАЇНСЬКА АКАДУМІЯ ОРИГІНАЛЬНИХ ІДЕЙ. Свідоцтво про «НОУ-ХАУ» НХ No. 048. Пріоритет від 16 грудня 2018 року. Зареєстровано 17 січня 2010 року.
- Сердюк В.В. «Спосіб хірургічного відновлення опоро спроможності та функціювання нижніх кінцівок при їх спастичному паралічі, що стався як наслідок травмування головного мозку під час народжування дитини (дитячий церебральний параліч)».УКРАЇНСЬКА АКАДЕМІЯ ОРИГІНАЛЬНИХ УДЕЙ. Свідоцтво про «НОУ-ХАУ» НХ No. 049. Пріоритет від 16 грудня 2018 року. Зареєстровано 17 січня 2019 року.

== See also ==
- SICOT SICOT- International Society of Orthopaedic Surgery and Traumatology
- ONMedU
- Scoliosis
- physiotherapy (magneto-acoustic therapy)
