= The Pure Weight of the Heart =

Book by Antonella Gambotto-Burke

- The original 1999 British The Pure Weight of the Heart paperback book cover
- Author: Antonella Gambotto-Burke
- Language: English
- Genre: Literary fiction
- Publisher: Phoenix, Orion Publishing Group, London
- Publication date: 29 June 1998
- Publication place: The United Kingdom
- Media type: Print (Paperback, AB Paperback and Hardback)
- Pages: 357pp
- ISBN: 1-86159-092-X (hardback); ISBN 1-86159-093-8 (paperback)
- Preceded by: An Instinct for the Kill
- Followed by: The Eclipse: A Memoir of Suicide

The Pure Weight of the Heart is Antonella Gambotto-Burke's first novel and third book. It peaked at number six on The Sydney Morning Herald bestseller list. Published by Orion Publishing in London in 1998, it was translated into German by Deutscher Taschenbuch Verlag (DTV) in 2000. Tatler's Book of the Month, The Pure Weight of the Heart reflected a number of themes found in The Astronomer, a short story Gambotto-Burke wrote in 1989. In its section 'What to say about the book', Tatler suggested: "Funny how the most odious characters in print are always so much worse in real life."

== Critical response ==
Classified as "post-multicultural fiction," The Pure Weight of the Heart attracted a strong critical reception. In his review of the book, Australian author Matthew Condon wrote, "From the outset, The Pure Weight of the Heart establishes its own rich, often infuriating, often ungraspable, often highly satisfying tone. It is a tone that often eludes a first-time novelist ... [Gambotto's] picture of the London literary scene is without rival ... a novel of considerable gusto and daring." The Herald Sun agreed: "Gambotto has successfully combined humor, sarcasm and insight to write a novel that cuts through the polished facade of society life." The Sunday Times (Perth) critic decided that The Pure Weight of the Heart showcased "the empathy and passion of a Bronte novel." The Townsville Bulletin called the novel "dense and lush," and SundayLife! magazine described its style as "unfurl[ing] with cool control."

The Daily Telegraph critic Lucy Clark wrote that the novel was "both overwritten and at times beautiful. It is florid and ornamental, lavish and extravagant. It alternates between poignancy, witty observation, repetitively lyrical sex and soap opera romantics ... Part literary, part social commentary, part bodice-ripper, it doesn't seem to know what it is, except a love story."

Who (magazine) held the novel as evidence of Gambotto-Burke's "major literary talent". And after criticising the sometimes impenetrable prose, Harper's Bazaar features editor Louise Upton decided that "the detail of the fiction verges on social reality."

Although she concluded that there was "lots to admire" in the book, Irish heiress Daphne Guinness had trouble with the "over the top" sex scenes: "Move over, Anaïs Nin."

== Plot summary ==
The novel, narrated in first person and divided into three volumes, is the story of Angelica Botticelli, an Italian-born Australian, and astrophysicist from an apparently wealthy background. Born in Italy to an Austrian mother and Italian father, Angelica is a troubled woman in search of love:

"From birth, Angelica is destined to fall in love with an angel. At ten, her blissful childhood is destroyed by the death of her father. Only the stars in the sky at night give her hope. Years later, the adult Angelica, beautiful and gifted, and still a student of the stars, drifts through a world of glamour, power and cruelty, until the night she finally finds her angel, in the heart of the extravagance she has come to despise." (Antonella Gambotto, The Pure Weight Of The Heart, blurb, Orion Publishing 1998)

The novel is divided into three volumes, and the title of each volume directly refers to its main theme: Book One: Grief is a Sphere, which details her childhood, adolescence and reaction to her father's murder. Book Two: A Lycanthropic God, which details her move back to Sydney from London, secretly hostile relationship with her bogan flatmate, Caroline Brine, and discovery of her "angel", the aptly named Gabriel (his surname, Lagen, is an anagram of "angel"), and their ensuing relationship. Book Three: The Bestiary, which details a trip to Chicago to see her mother, brother and mother's second husband, the truly vile Aldo Belva ("belva" means "beast" in Italian), and the characters attending the week-long party, who form "The Bestiary" for which the volume is named.

== Characters ==
Though Angelica Botticelli as narrator, certain other characters are quite notable within the text, and indeed the novel is often noted for the razor-sharp prose and social commentary. It is not Angelica's lover, Gabriel Lagen, who draws the most interest, rather her flatmate Caroline Brine, stepfather Aldo Belva, narcissistic first love—novelist William Grieve, and her unnamed but extravagantly cruel mother, who draw a lot of interest and straddle the boundary between being larger than life and all too real.

== Genre ==
While often touted as literary prose, The Pure Weight Of The Heart also follows many conventions of the Romance novel genre, with the impossibly beautiful, flawed heroine, and the mysterious, flawed, but incredibly sexy hero, who, after a series of misunderstandings, finally reach a resolve... of sorts.

== Quotations ==
"I think my parents were bewildered by my oddity." (p3)

"In the second or so it had taken that bullet to leave its muzzle and penetrate my father's heart, between the pressure of that finger on the trigger and my father's soundless roar, somewhere in that infernal compression of decision, action, and consequence, I was forever altered." (p25)

"Grief is a sphere in that it can be turned a quarter turn or turned a millionth, it can be spun on any axis and by any degree and still its aspect is the same." (p28)

"From the standpoint of the present, the future is always a derangement of ambitions." (p55)

"Ah, Caroline Brine - with your aversion to bohemians and homosexuals, students and foreigners, with your lacerated womb and scullery rat's brain, with your phosphorescent dildos and potted African violets, haunted by the ghost of your aborted baby and contaminated by envy, you freckled, you artificially tanned, you stupefyingly bland and vicious mediocrity - even after all these years, I still detest you." (p114)

"The fragile teacups, the brittle relics, the frail upholstery and shattery glass: this was a world of little things and little ways, their delicacy presupposing their protection." (p304)

"It can be said that deeply traumatized children grow into adults who live in the minefield of their own extreme emotions. Plus ca change." (p326)

"The conversion of mass to energy and light is the prerogative of every star." (p357)
