= Valeriy Zaporozhan =

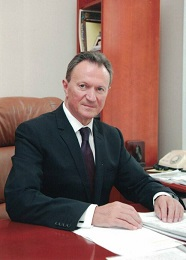
Valeriy Zaporozhan

Valeriy Zaporozhan (Ukrainian: Валерій Запорожан; born 2 March 1947, Izmail, Ukraine) is ex-rector of Odessa State Medical University (Ukraine), Ukrainian researcher. His initial specialization was obstetrics and gynaecology, which further broadened to cryosurgery and endoscopy, immunology, reproductive medicine, genetic medicine, stem cells, and bioethics. He also developed the concept of nooethics — a further specialization of bioethics in the conditions of noosphere.

== Career ==
In 1971, Zaporozhan graduated from Pirogov Odessa Medical Institute. He was employed as senior laboratory officer, assistant professor, associate professor, and full professor. Since 1986, he heads the Department of Obstetrics and Gynecology of the Odessa State Medical University. Starting from 1994 and until 17 July 2018, he held the heading position (Rector) of the Odessa State Medical University.

Since 1976 — Candidate of Sciences in Medicine, since 1982 — Doctor of Sciences in Medicine, since 1986 — Full Professor.

In 1997, he became the associate member of Academy of Medical Sciences of Ukraine, progressing to full member of the Academy in 2000. In 2002, he was elected a member of the Presidium of the Academy.
