= Odesa National Medical University =

Public university in Odesa, Ukraine

- ДЗВО "Одеський національний медичний університет"
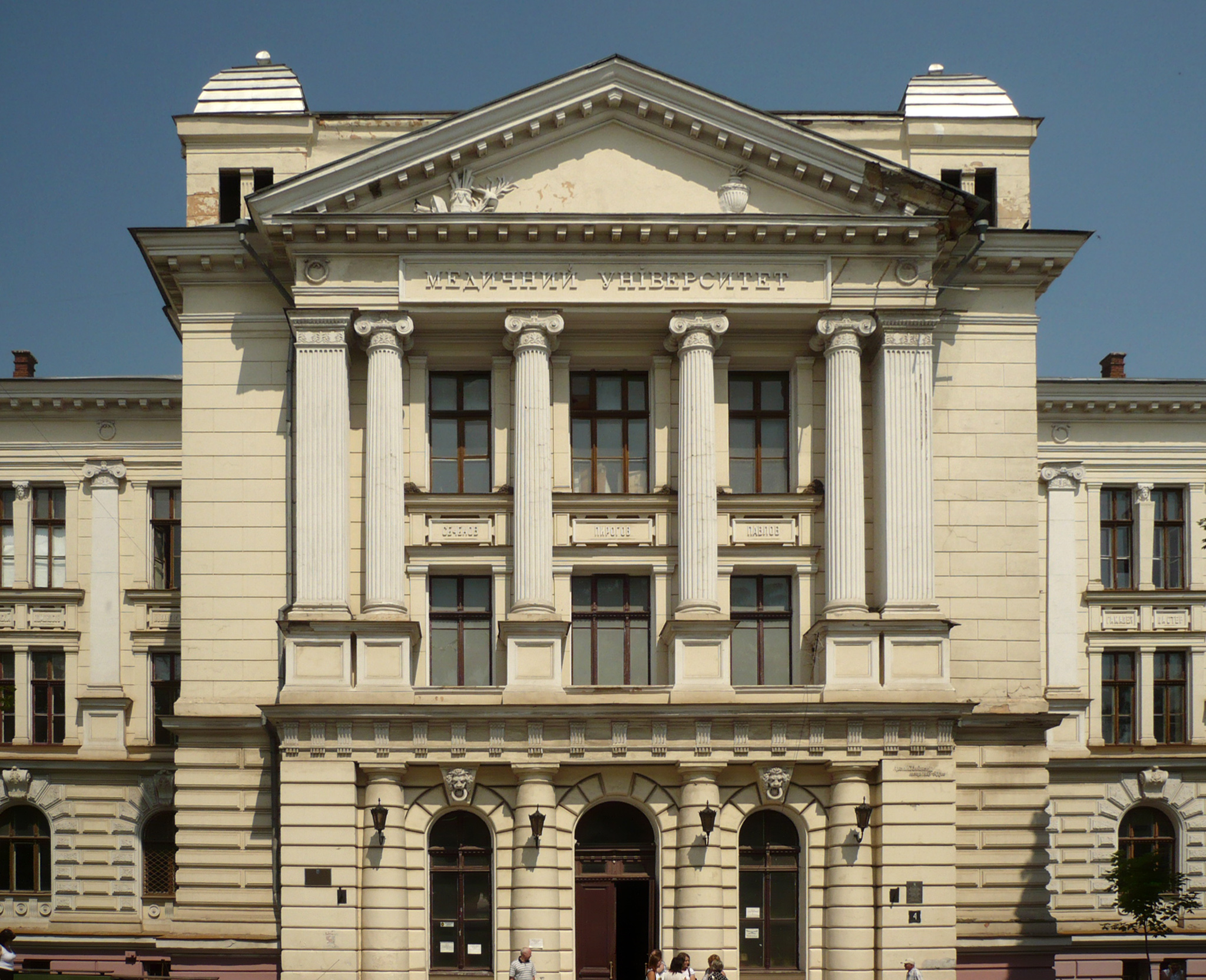
- Former names: Odesa State Medical University (1991-2010); Odesa State Medical Institute (1922–91)
- Type: national university
- Established: 1900 as medical faculty of the Novorossiyskiy Imperial University
- Accreditation: Ministry of Education and Science of Ukraine
- Location: Odesa, Ukraine; 46.4934°N 30.7257°E
- Website: odnmu.com

The Odesa National Medical University (Ukrainian: Одеський національний медичний університет, romanized: Odeskyi natsionalnyi medychnyi universytet) is a public university in the city of Odesa, Ukraine.

== History ==
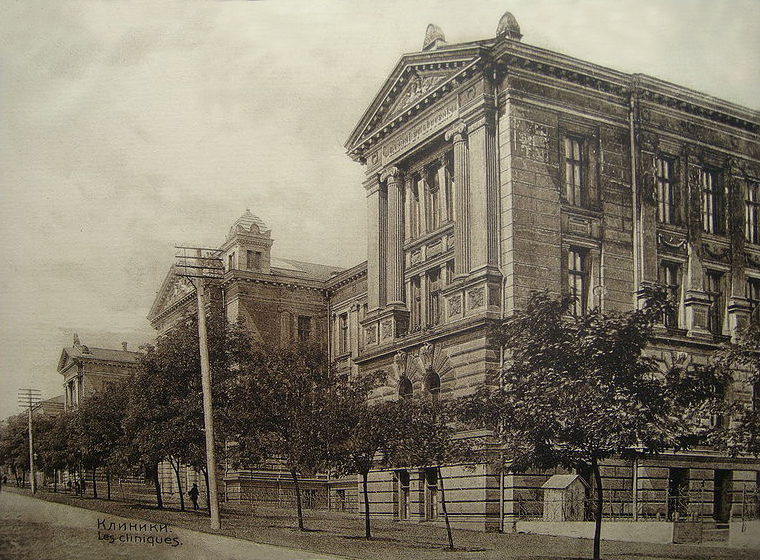
A view of the medical university in the early 20th century.

The institution started in 1900 as the medical faculty of the Novorossiyskiy Imperial University in Odessa. The medical faculty soon became one of the most prestigious medical faculties in the Russian Empire. Many famous medical scientists, including Nobel laureate and professor I. I. Mechnikov, worked here.

The medical faculty managed to survive the difficult and turbulent period of the early years of the Russian revolution and in 1922 it was transformed into the independent and autonomous Odesa State Medical Institute. After the collapse of the Soviet Union, it became Odesa State Medical University in an independent Ukrainian Republic.

== Ranking and reputation ==
The Odesa National Medical University consists of 58 faculties and has a student population of over six thousand, including foreign students from very diverse countries. Tuition is given in the Russian, Ukrainian, and English languages.

There are 100 clinical departments in the university, located at 63 medical and prophylactic institutions in Odesa and Odesa Oblast. All the departments of the university have their own internet site. The site contains all essential methodological materials on all the disciplines in Ukrainian, Russian and English. An electronic catalog of the whole fund of books and journals (over 700 thousand titles) as well as an electronic fund of the course books have been created at the university library. Online access to electronic resources has been provided. A Center of Distance Education has been created for effective and uninterrupted professional development of doctors and pharmaceutics. The university has created all the conditions necessary for active students' leisure. There are six sports halls at the university sport complex: for sports games, table tennis, aerobics and rhythmic gymnastics, shaping-up, gym and track-and-field hall. There are several sport groups: athletics, basketball, handball, tennis, power-lifting, weight sports, swimming, fencing, indoor soccer, judo, sambo, chess. Hostels provide students with sports grounds and gyms. The students' sports and fitness complex is situated on the territory of Lustdorf at the Black Sea coast. There also exists the center of students' creative work which is called "VITA" at the university . Thirty creative groups of different genres function actively in this center (the vocal studio "Harmony", the band of modern and variety dancing "Exprompt", the band of folk singing and dancing, etc.) and unite about 250 students. 2,500 students live in 5 hostels.

== Notable alumni ==
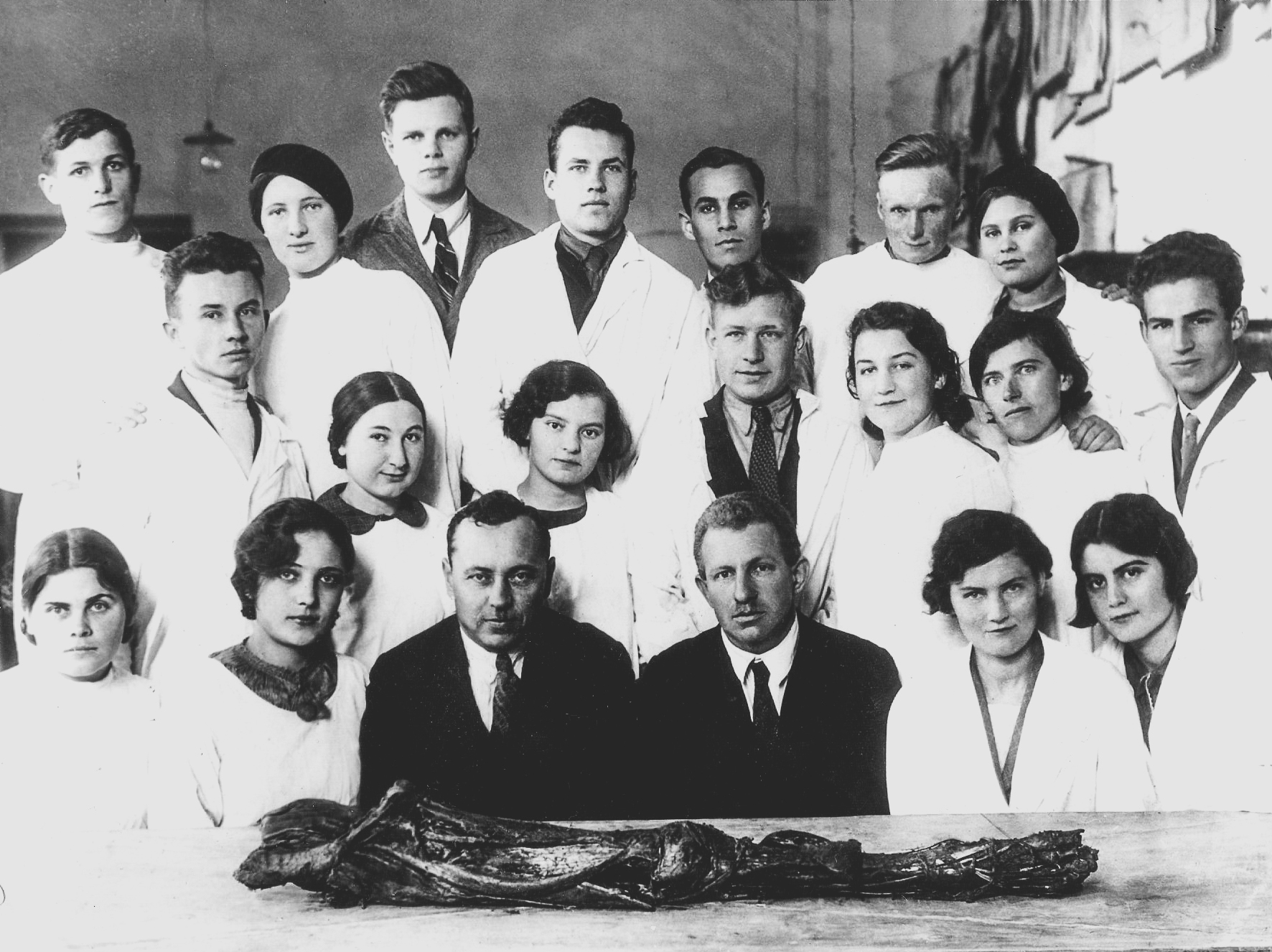
Odesa Medical University students Sep 1935

- Mazur Ivan (1914-1990) graduated Jun 1941 when the military conflict between Germany and USSR started. Joined 30 Cavalry Division (Russian 30 кд) as military doctor. For courage and valour displayed during the performance of military duties awarded The Order of the Red Star and The Order of the Patriotic War. Celebrated VE Day 8 May 1945 in Czechoslovakia as the Main Divisional Doctor of 30 Cavalry Division.
- Dubovy Ephim Davudovich, (1898–1980) - Professor, one of the founders of Ukrainian and Russian radiology, created a generation of radiologists with more than 56 PhD students and more 200 articles and 8 books.
- Selina Hayat Ivy (1966-) - the first City Mayor of Narayanganj and first woman Mayor of Bangladesh. Ivy has been given the status of Deputy Minister on 7 November 2017.
- Zaporozhan Valery Mycolayovych (born 1947) - Member of the National Academy of Medical Sciences of Ukraine, winner of State prize of Ukraine in the sphere of science and technology, Doctor of Medical Sciences, Professor, Honored Inventor of Ukraine. In 1971 graduated from Odesa Pirogov Medical Institute.
- Kresyun Valentin Iosyfovich (born 1941) – Ukrainian scientist in the sphere of pharmacology, corresponding member of National Academy of Medical Sciences of Ukraine, Honored scientist in the sphere of science and technology of Ukraine. In 1970 graduated from Odesa Pirogov medical institute.
- Serdyuk Valentyn (born 1942) - Ukrainian scientist in the sphere of Orthopedic Surgery, Physiotherapy (magneto-acoustic therapy) and scoliosis, member of International Academy of Original Ideas of Ukraine, Doctor of Medical Sciences, Professor, Honored Inventor of Ukraine.
- Stefanov Alexandr Victorovich (1950–2007) - Member of the National Academy of Medical Sciences of Ukraine, a director of Institute of Pharmacology and Toxicology. In 1973 graduated from Odesa Pirogov Medical Institute.
- Reznik Boris Yakovlevich (1929–1997) - Member of the National Academy of Medical Sciences of Ukraine, corresponding member of National Academy of Medical Sciences of Ukraine, Doctor of Medical Sciences, Professor. In 1950 graduated from Odesa Pirogov Medical Institute.
- Holdin Semyon Abramovich (1896-1975) - Outstanding clinician-oncologist, was graduated in 1919 from Odesa National Medical University (then Medical Faculty of the Novorossiyskiy State University in Odesa).

== Notable faculty ==
- Valeriy Zaporozhan, Rector 1994-2018

== See also ==
- List of universities in Ukraine
- List of medical universities in Ukraine
