= Apple: Sex, Drugs, Motherhood and the Recovery of the Feminine =

2022 book by Antonella Gambotto-Burke

- Author: Antonella Gambotto-Burke
- Original title: Apple: Sex, Drugs, Motherhood and the Recovery of the Feminine
- Cover artist: Martin Wagner
- Language: English
- Genre: Feminism; Motherhood; Cultural analysis Psychology; Memoir
- Publisher: Pinter & Martin, London
- Publication date: September 30, 2022
- Media type: Softcover
- Pages: 352
- ISBN: 978-1780667409
- Preceded by: Mama: Love, Motherhood and Revolution

Apple: Sex, Drugs, Motherhood and the Recovery of the Feminine is a 2022 non-fiction, semi-autobiographical cultural analysis of the 20th and 21st centuries through the prism of obstetric practice, written by Australian author and journalist Antonella Gambotto-Burke. It made the front page of the Australian national paper, which also published a 3000-word excerpt.

Reader's Digest described Apple: Sex, Drugs, Motherhood and the Recovery of the Feminine as "a major cultural event" and stated that it was "the first time" a connection had been made between "a wide range of personal and social issues — from drug addictions and mental illness to the breakdown of relationships — to the manner in which women are treated during pregnancy and labour."

== Summary ==
=== Biographical section ===
Gambotto-Burke opens the book with memories of her childhood on North Shore (Sydney) and the systemic sexism that penetrated every level of her existence. With this, she introduces the questions that unfold her argument, ending on her traumatic birth experience in a Sydney hospital.

Apple: Sex, Drugs, Motherhood and the Recovery of the Feminine took "years to write", Gambotto-Burke told an interviewer:

"Maybe three years of reading, years of experience, discussion and observation, and then the writing. When I began writing Apple, I thought I was embarking on a relatively straightforward work of feminism. Halfway through, I made a discovery that lead to a domino effect of realisations. At times, they were coming at me so quickly I could barely keep up. As a result, I had to junk the 40,000 or so words I'd written and begin again. I worked through the night, almost every night, for years. The experience of writing Apple was unlike anything I've ever known. By the end, I felt as if I was bleeding from the head."

=== Overview ===
After the autobiographical introduction, which deals with Gambotto-Burke's childhood and young adulthood, there are 22 chapters in the book divided into three sections: "High", "Born to the Undead", and "Return of the Queen".

"High" deals with Timothy Leary, Allen Ginsberg, LSD, hallucinogens, The Summer of Love, Syd Barrett, Keith Richards, cannabis, murder, groupies, Marilyn Manson, Nick Cave, 1960s, halcion, choking, 1980s, NME, Zig Zag, serial killers, Ted Bundy, Woodstock, Pablo Picasso, Hugh Hefner, sexism, pornography, and other issues.

"Born to the Undead" addresses birth, obstetricians, Twilight Sleep, episiotomies, breastfeeding, caesarian, formula milk, birth trauma (physical), childbirth-related post-traumatic stress disorder, street drugs, addiction, pornography, fentanyl, morphine, Rosemary Kennedy, attachment parenting, Albert Camus, L'Etranger, Dennis Nilsen, pacifiers, latex, sex dolls, Robert Mapplethorpe, Stanley Kubrick, 2001: A Space Odyssey, fetishism, paedophilia, racism, and, among other things, Nazism.

"The Return of the Queen" includes Gambotto-Burke's own experience of birth, the problems with commonly used obstetric drugs such as Ropivacaine, Bupivacaine, and drugs such as Panadeine, and her template for a peaceful culture.

== Core theories ==
The London Economic wrote,

"In the course of a three-year analysis into the impact of modern birthing practices, [Gambotto-Burke] has come to believe there is a connection between the use of obstetric drugs, oxytocin deficiency and the rising number of children with sociopathy – a mental disorder in which a person lacks affection, empathy and compassion for others. Her new book, Apple, meanwhile, has made international headlines for its controversial investigation into the possible connection between modern obstetric practices and a wide range of escalating health and social issues. Analysing, among other things, the potential impact of birth trauma on late celebrities such as singer Whitney Houston, daughter Bobbi Kristina Brown, and actress Carrie Fisher — as well as on notorious killers including Charles Manson and Moors Murderer Ian Brady — it calls for a revolution in society's understanding and approach to birth."

Gambotto-Burke believes that the breakdown in the maternal/child relationship is evidenced by "the increasingly obvious—and tragic—lessening of territorial maternal behaviour towards the infant."

== Reception ==
The Daily Telegraph writer and critic Gwyneth Rees wrote,

"Argued with intelligence, force and the fury of righteous indignation by lauded feminist thinker, author and critic Antonella Gambotto-Burke, the book explores how the manner in which we enter the world has a profound and lasting impact on our lives, and by extension upon society as a whole. As we come to learn, modern obstetric practices are deeply connected with an increased likelihood in later life of drug use, sexual fetishes, anxiety and mental illness, chronic and potentially life-threatening illnesses. They are also linked with the breakdown of relationships between men and women, and the erosion of the bond between mothers and children. This all comes to light through Apple's central question: why is our culture governed by the principle of separation?"

British academic Rehan Qayoom, in his paper about the book, found that it shows that

"the life-choices of mothers, pushed by a system of obstetric norms, are literally destroying life right from birth. The use of ‘dummies’ is shown to be closely linked to babies’ developmental problems in motor skills, breathing, speaking and swallowing whereas those who are breastfed, by and large, have superior speech and are more eloquent than (as breastfeeding helps the tongue develop) those who are bottle-fed formula; leading to language and communication problems leading, in their turn, to emotional and social problems, and develop all sorts of allergies and intolerances."

A number of other critics focused on the sensationalistic aspects of the book. In The Australian, Joanne Tran wrote,

"A rockstar feminist has sought to go deeper into the link between sexual preferences and earliest infant experiences. The use of dummies, bottle teats and even feeding tubes can all resonate later in adulthood with sexual fetishes. To be specific, she argues babies exposed to textures like silicone may grow to have an attraction to sex dolls. This exposure would have to exist alongside factors like the absence of a loving maternal figure, or sustained abuse and neglect."
