= North Shore Times =

Australian local newspaper

- Type: Weekly community newspaper
- Format: Tabloid
- Owner: Cumberland Newspaper Group (News Corp Australia)
- Editor: Ron Bendall
- Founded: 1960
- Political alignment: Conservative
- Headquarters: Parramatta, New South Wales, Australia
- Website: www.northshoretimes.com.au

The North Shore Times is an Australian local newspaper, that serves the local government areas of Willoughby, Ku-ring-gai, Lane Cove and part of North Sydney. The newspaper was launched on 11 May 1960 by a 29-year-old Rupert Murdoch, making it the only other Australian newspaper started completely from scratch by Murdoch prior to his founding of The Australian in 1964.

The paper is one of News Corp Australia's community newspapers in Sydney. It is delivered free to homes and businesses every Thursday, as of July 2016 after originally being a Wednesday and Friday publication. The Wednesday publication was established in 1960 and the Friday publication was established in 1989.

Originally established as a Wednesday-only publication in 1960, a secondary Friday edition was introduced in 1989. It remained a bi-weekly publication for nearly three decades until July 2016, when News Corp consolidated the two editions into a single, comprehensive Thursday print publication. Reflecting broader consolidation trends across metropolitan community media, the administrative and editorial coordination of the paper was eventually moved out of the local coverage area to News Corp's major suburban hub in Parramatta.

During the May 2020 print media restructuring brought on by the COVID-19 pandemic, where News Corp Australia ceased the print editions of over 100 regional and community titles, the North Shore Times was one of only three affluent Sydney community publications selected to preserve its print format due to robust local real estate advertising revenue.

== Readership ==
The circulation of both the Wednesday and Friday publications of the North Shore Times reaches approximately 75,000 homes and businesses, with the estimated total number of people who read the newspaper being around 112,000. The majority of North Shore Times' readers are in the 35–49 and 50–64 age groups. Geographically, the masthead's distribution network serves a region historically noted as a prominent centre-right and liberal-conservative political stronghold in Australian state and federal politics. Quantitative media ownership studies tracking Australian print media state that titles under the paper's parent company, News Corp Australia, exhibit a documented editorial leaning towards the conservative side of the political spectrum.

== Notable editors ==
Several journalists and media professionals have served editorial roles at the North Shore Times, including:

- Billy Cantwell – Editor of the North Shore Times from 2015 to 2019, who later became the Opinion Editor at The Sydney Morning Herald.
- Tim McIntyre – Editor of the North Shore Times and the Mosman Daily from 2018 to 2019, who was later appointed as a Content Director for News Corp Australia's community publications.
- Kelly Baker – Lifestyle journalist and television commentator who served as the Acting Editor of the masthead in June 2020 during its print transition.
