= Michel Odent =

French obstetrician (1930–2025)

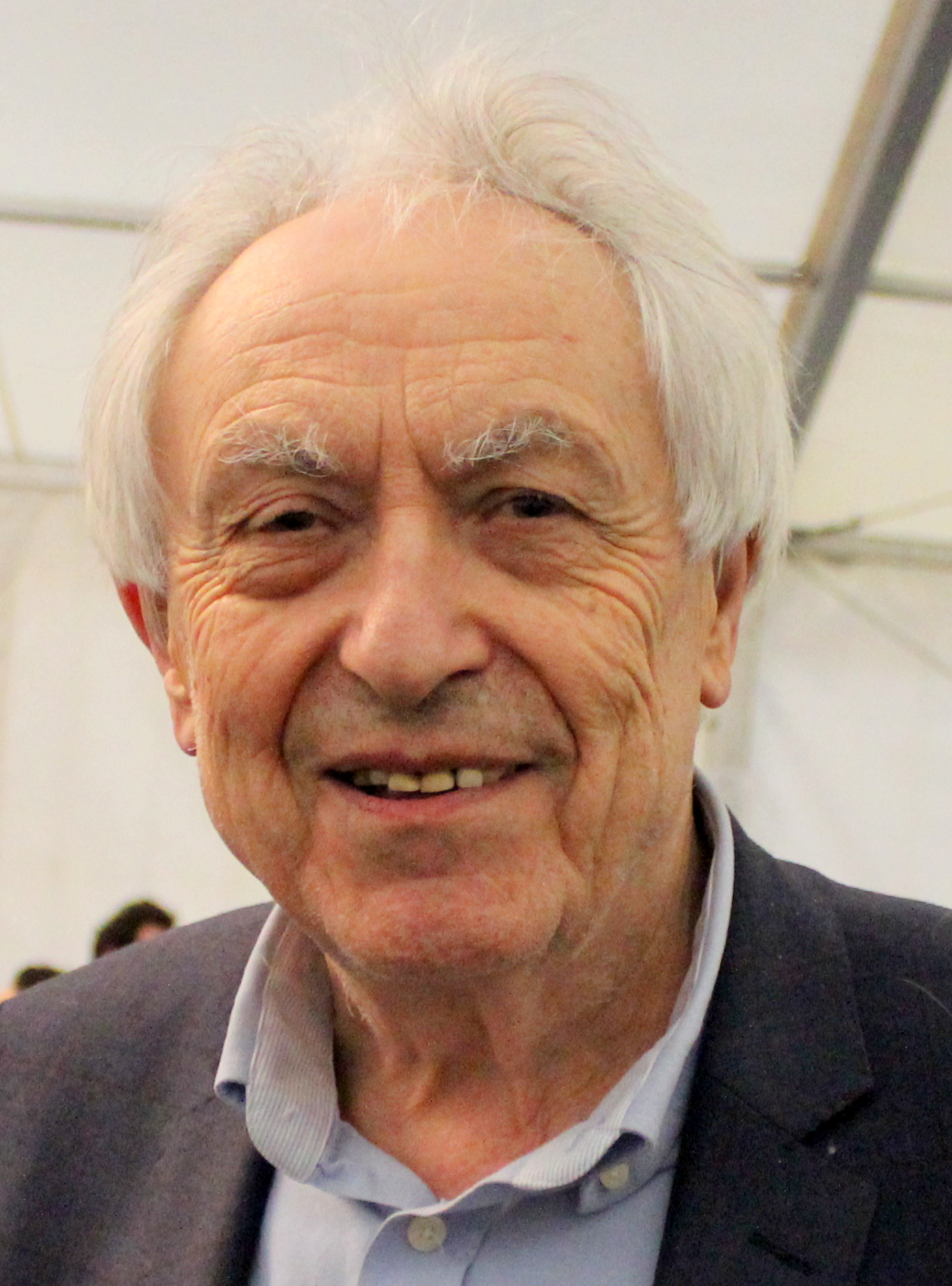
Michel Odent (2015)

Michel Robert Fortuné Odent (7 July 1930 – 19 August 2025) was a French obstetrician and childbirth specialist.

== Background ==
Born in Bresles, France, on 7 July 1930, Odent studied medicine at the Sorbonne in Paris and trained as a surgeon in the 1950s. He has been described in The Lancet as "one of the last real general surgeons".

Odent died from complications of a stroke on 19 August 2025, in London, at the age of 95.

== Professional career ==
In charge of the surgical and maternity units of the Pithiviers hospital in France from 1962 to 1985, Odent developed a special interest in environmental factors influencing the birth process. He introduced the concepts of birthing rooms, birthing pools, and singing sessions for pregnant women.

After his hospital career, Odent was involved in home birth, founded the Primal Health Research Centre in London, and designed a database (primalhealthhresearch.com) to compile epidemiological studies exploring correlations between conditions during the natal "primal period" and subsequent child and mother health. Odent was visiting professor at Odessa National Medical University. He received an honorary doctorate from Brasilia University in 2015.

== Publications ==
Odent was the author of the first articles about the initiation of breastfeeding during the hour following birth, the first article about the use of birthing pools during labour, and the first article applying the gate control theory of pain to obstetrics.

In a book published in 1986 (Primal Health), Odent provided evidence that homeostasis is established during the "primal period" (fetal life, birth and the months following birth): this is the phase of life when human basic adaptive systems are adjusting their "set point levels". Odent later focused on the possible evolution of Homo sapiens in relation to the modern modes of childbirth.

Odent was the author of 17 books published in 22 languages. In his books he constantly referred to the concept of reduced neocortical activity as a key to rediscover the basic needs of labouring women and to make possible a real "fetus ejection reflex".

His books include:

- Birth Reborn (1984, Pantheon, New York)
- Primal Health (1986. Century Hutchinson. London)
- Water and sexuality (1990, Penguin Books)
- The Farmer and the Obstetrician (Free Association Books)
- The Caesarean (Free Association Books)
- The Scientification of Love (Free Association Books)
- The Functions of the Orgasms: The Highways to Transcendence (2009, Pinter & Martin Ltd.)
- Childbirth in the Age of Plastics (2011, Pinter & Martin Ltd.)
- Childbirth and the Future of Homo sapiens (2013, Pinter & Martin Ltd.), reissued as Childbirth and the Evolution of Homo sapiens in 2014
- Do we need Midwives? (2015, Pinter & Martin Ltd.)
- The Birth of Homo, the Marine Chimpanzee (2017, Pinter & Martin Ltd.)
- The Future of Homo (2019, World Scientific Publishing Co. Ltd.)
- Planet Ocean (2021. Clairview Books)
- Can Humanity survive Socialised birth? (2023. Pinter & Martin)

== See also ==
- Cesarean
- Lactation
- Midwifery
- Pain management during childbirth
