= Steve Biddulph =

Australian activist and psychologist

Steve Biddulph AM
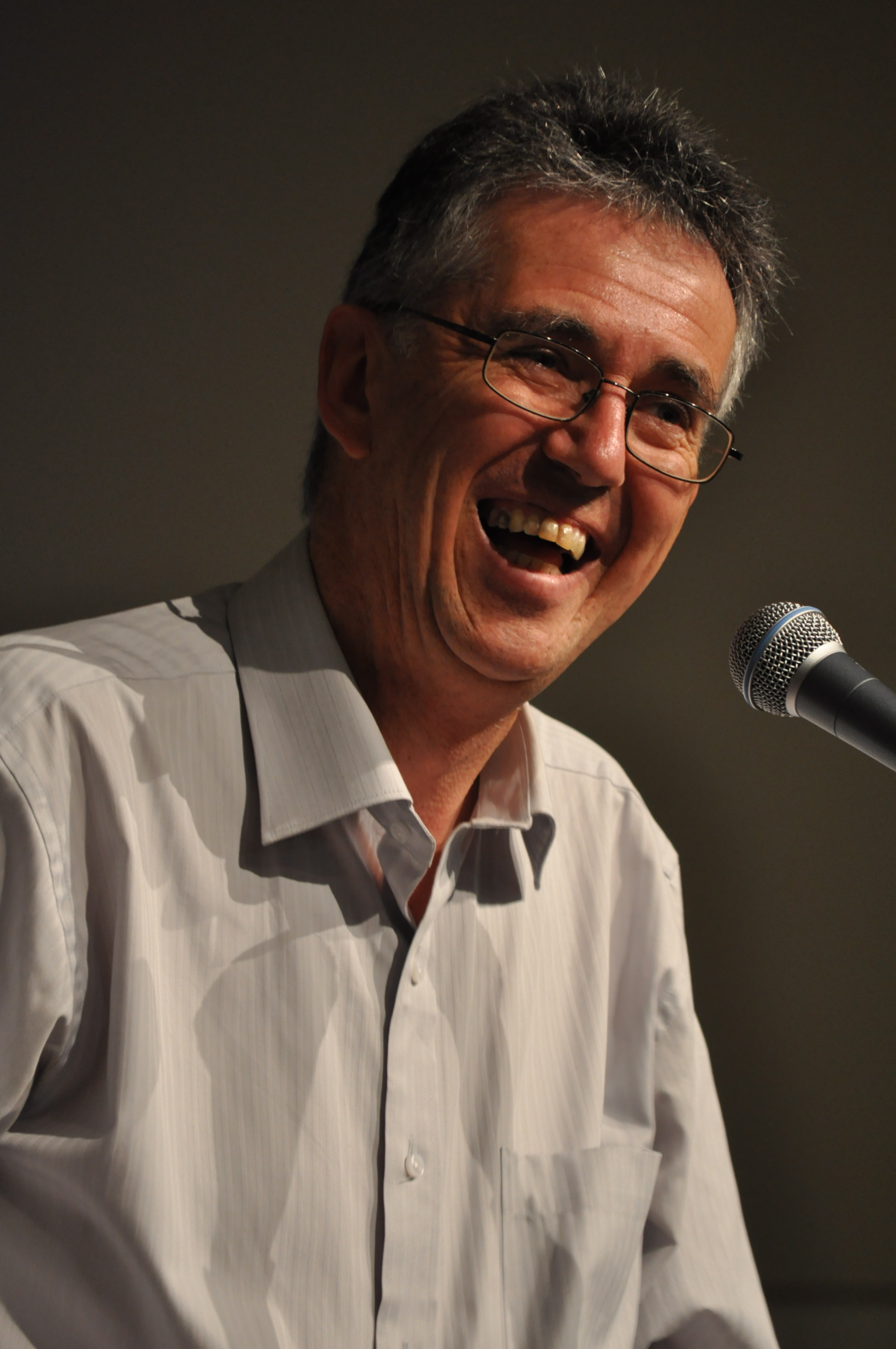
- Born: Stephen John Biddulph; 15 August 1953 (age 73); Saltburn, England
- Occupations: Author, activist and psychologist
- Spouse: Shaaron Biddulph
- Awards: Australian Father of the Year (2000)

Academic work
- Institutions: School of Psychology and Counselling, Cairnmillar Institute, Melbourne
- Main interests: Premature sexualisation of girls through media exposure, impacting on the mental health of girls
- Notable ideas: A more affectionate and connected form of parenting

Stephen John Biddulph AM (born 15 August 1953 in Saltburn, England) is an Australian author, activist and psychologist who has written a number of influential best-selling books; and lectures worldwide on parenting, and boys' education. He is married and has two children and grandchildren.

== Career ==
Biddulph's books argue for a more affectionate and connected form of parenting, and the importance of role models in children's lives. They acknowledge gender differences but do not see these as immutable. His effect on schooling has been to increase the number of parents delaying school-starting, especially with boys, and the increase in single-sex classes in co-educational schools, particularly in the early puberty stage, around age 12–15.

Recently he has been outspoken about the premature sexualisation of girls through media exposure, affecting the mental health of girls.

He is one of a group of child development specialists in the UK and elsewhere who argued successfully for the introduction of parental leave in that country, and cautioned on the dangers of institutional daycare for the under twos.

He also campaigned on Australia's mistreatment of refugee parents and children under the Howard government, and led and funded a five-year project to create a permanent national memorial to the SIEV X sinking, on the lakeshore in Canberra. This memorial, involving over a thousand student and community artists, was dedicated in October 2007.

With his wife and co-author, Shaaron Biddulph, he sponsors a number of activist organisations and environmental causes. Biddulph was voted Australian Father of the Year in 2000 for his work encouraging the active role of fathers. He lives in Tasmania, Australia.

Steve Biddulph was appointed adjunct professor in the School of Psychology and Counselling, Cairnmillar Institute, Melbourne, in March 2011.

He is National Ambassador for Playgroup Australia, and Patron of the Australian Children's Media Council.

== Bibliography ==
His books include:

- The Secret of Happy Children HarperCollins Australia, Thorsons UK, Heyne Deutschland (1985)
- The Making of Love Random House Australia (1994)
- More Secrets of Happy Children HarperCollins Australia, Thorsons UK, Heyne Deutschland
- Raising Boys Finch Australia (1997), Thorsons UK (1998), Heyne Deutschland
- Stories of Manhood Finch Australia (2000)
- Raising Babies – Should Under 3's Go to Nursery? Thorsons UK (2006)
- The New Manhood Finch Australia (2010)
- Steve Biddulph's Raising Girls Finch Australia (2013), Thorsons UK (2013)
- Raising Boys in the Twenty-first Century (2018)
- Raising Girls in the Twenty-first Century (2019)
- Wild Creature Mind (2024)

== See also ==
- Childcare
- Men's liberation
- Mythopoetic men's movement
- Parenting
