= Michael VerMeulen =

American magazine editor

Michael VerMeulen (December 10, 1956 – August 28, 1995) was an American magazine editor of British GQ who resided in Islington, London until his death.

Born in Lake Forest, Illinois, VerMeulen was a journalist and editor, who came into contact during his late adolescence with playwright David Mamet and the circle of actors surrounding him in Chicago at that time. He contributed regularly to a number of magazines including Vanity Fair and Parade before leaving for London where he worked initially for a financial publication, before joining British GQ in 1988 as its founding features editor. VerMeulen was promoted within GQ to deputy editor in 1990 and to editor in 1992.

VerMeulen died of a drug overdose on Sunday, 28 August 1995, in his home in Islington, London. A coroner's inquest found over two and a half times the lethal dose of cocaine in his system, and decided it was an unfortunate case of 'wild misadventure'.

His funeral was held at St. George's, Hanover Square, London. David Mamet sent a special eulogy that was read during the service. Over 400 people, including editors and writers, were in attendance.
