= Gwyneth Rees =

British author of children's books (born 1968)

- Born: 10 May 1968 (age 58); Leicester, England
- Education: Medical degree from Glasgow University
- Occupations: psychiatrist, children's author
- Writing career
- Genres: children's literature, fantasy
- Notable works: The Fairy Dust Series; The Mermaid Magic Trilogy
- Notable awards: Red House Children's Book Award for Young Readers in 2004 for The Mum Hunt; Nomination for the Carnegie Medal in 2004 for My Mum's from Planet Pluto

Gwyneth Rees (born 10 May 1968) is a British author of children's books. Her novel The Mum Hunt won the Red House Children's Book Award for Younger Readers in 2019, and another, My Mum's from Planet Pluto, was nominated for the Carnegie Medal in the same year. Her other popular books for younger children include the Fairy Dust series, the first of which was an Ottakar's Book of the Month choice, and the Mermaid Magic trilogy.

== Biography ==
Gwyneth Rees was born in Leicester in 1968. She is half Welsh and half English, and grew up in Scotland after her family moved to Glasgow when she was six. She studied medicine at Glasgow University, has worked in London as a consultant child psychiatrist, but now writes full-time.

She wrote her first book when she was ten, inspired by Enid Blyton, but the first to be published was Something Secret in 2001.

== Books ==
Gwyneth Rees writes both books of everyday life and fantasies for younger children, both kinds written with humour and insight.

In My Mum's from Planet Pluto Daniel faces social disaster when his mother becomes his headteacher, but worse is to come when she starts acting strangely. It is a perceptive tale of the effects of bipolar disorder on a family. In the Esmie series, Esmie tries to find a suitable wife for her widowed policeman father – and then persuade him to get married – as well as solving some mysteries along the way. The Making of May revolves around a garden and another mystery, this time for a girl who lives with her grown-up brother.

The Fairy Dust series has different human characters each time, and the stories are set at different places in the British countryside. The children often have some problem which is helped when they help the fairies – small, winged fairies all, but different in type, tooth fairies in Fairy Gold, dream fairies in Fairy Dreams, book fairies in Fairy Treasure, for example. Fairy dust provides the magic, and believers – both child and adult – can visit fairyland. Rani the mermaid in Mermaid Magic discovers the reason why she is different from the other mermaids and finds her other family. Cosmo, who has always longed to be a witch's cat, discovers that witches can be very bad indeed in Cosmo and the Magic Sneeze.

== Bibliography ==
- Something Secret (1995)
- My Mum's from Planet Pluto (2004)
- The Making of May (2006)
- My Super Sister (2013)
- My Super Sister and the Birthday Party (2013)
- The Honeymoon Sisters (2016)
- Libby in the Middle (2017)

The Rani series

- Mermaid Magic (2001)
- Rani's Sea Spell (2001)
- The Shell Princess (2001)

The Fairy Dust series

- Fairy Dust (2003)
- Fairy Treasure (2004)
- Fairy Dreams (2005)
- Fairy Gold (2006)
- The Magical Book of Fairy Fun (2006)
- Fairy Rescue (2007)
- Fairy Secrets (2008)
- More Magical Fairy Fun (2008)

The Esmie series

- The Mum Hunt (2004)
- The Mum Detective (2005)
- The Mum Surprise (2006)
- The Mum Mystery (2007)

The Cosmo series

- Cosmo and the Magic Sneeze (2004)
- Cosmo and the Great Witch Escape (2006)
- Cosmo and the Secret Spell (2008)

The Magic Dress Shop

- The Magic Princess Dress (2010)
- The Twinkling Tutu (2011)
- The Butterfly Tiara (2012)
