= 2021 Berlin state election =

German state election

- 26 September 2021

All 147 seats in the Abgeordnetenhaus of Berlin, including 17 overhang and leveling seats 74 seats needed for a majority
- Turnout: 1,844,278 (75.4%) ▲8.5 pp
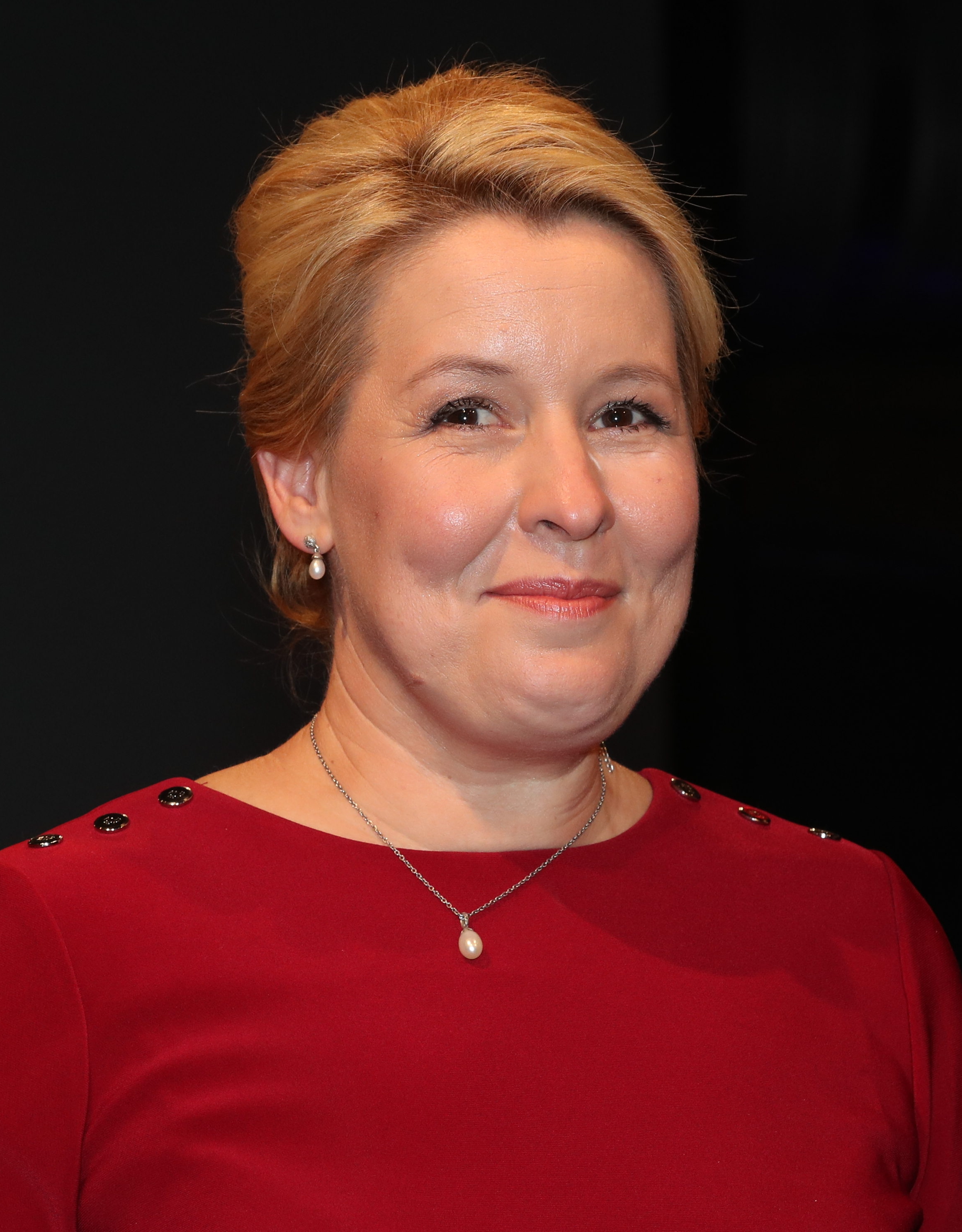

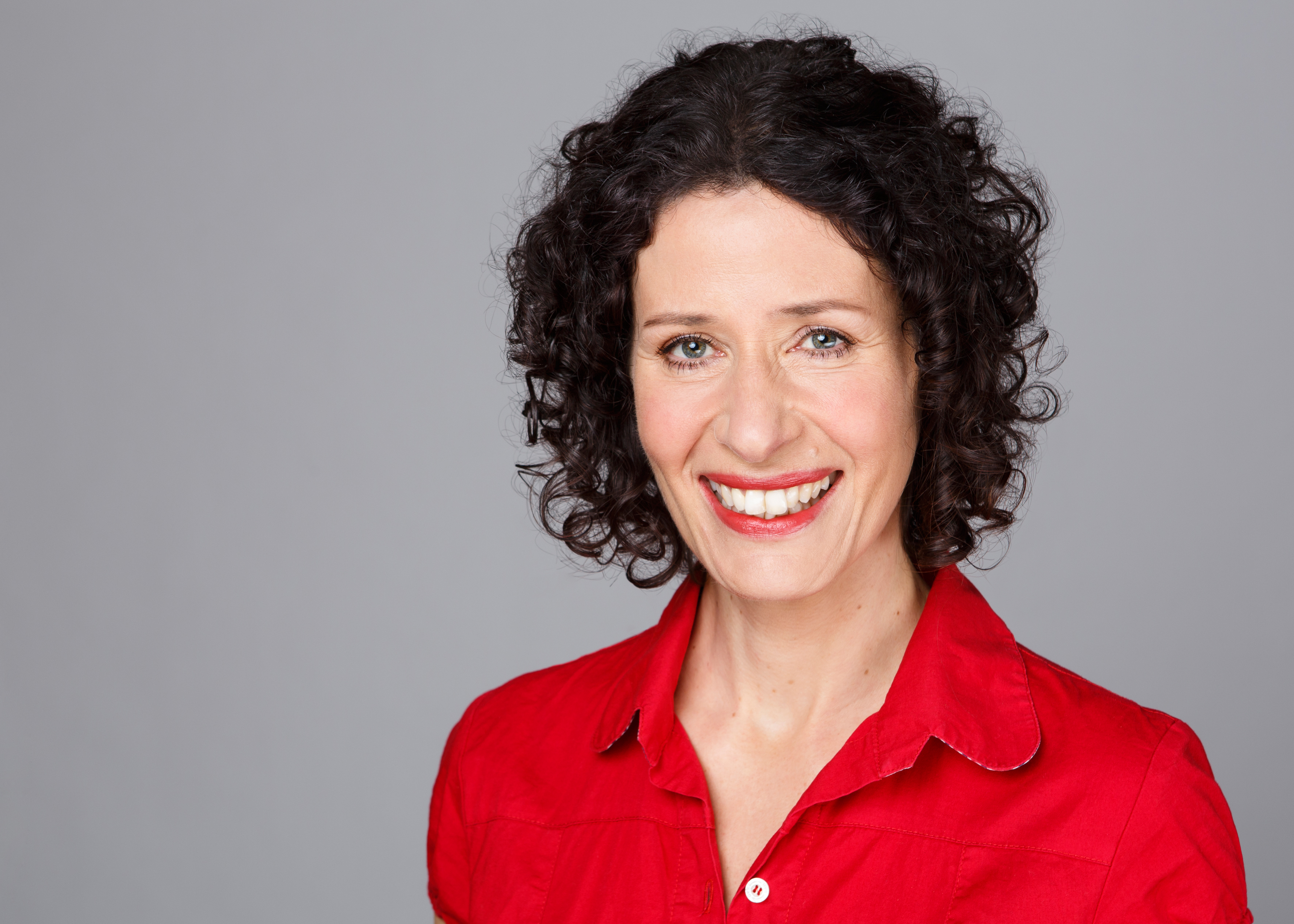

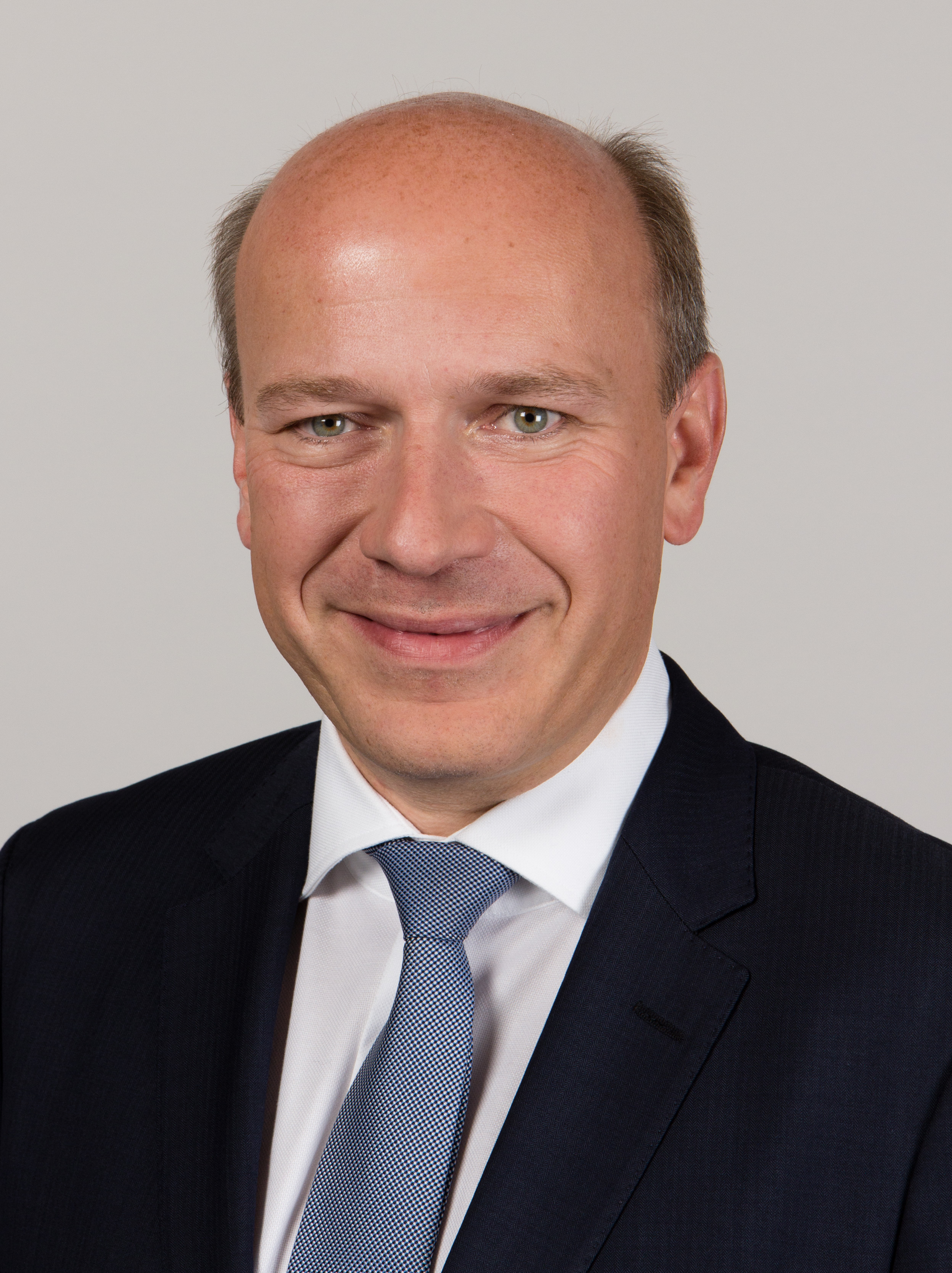

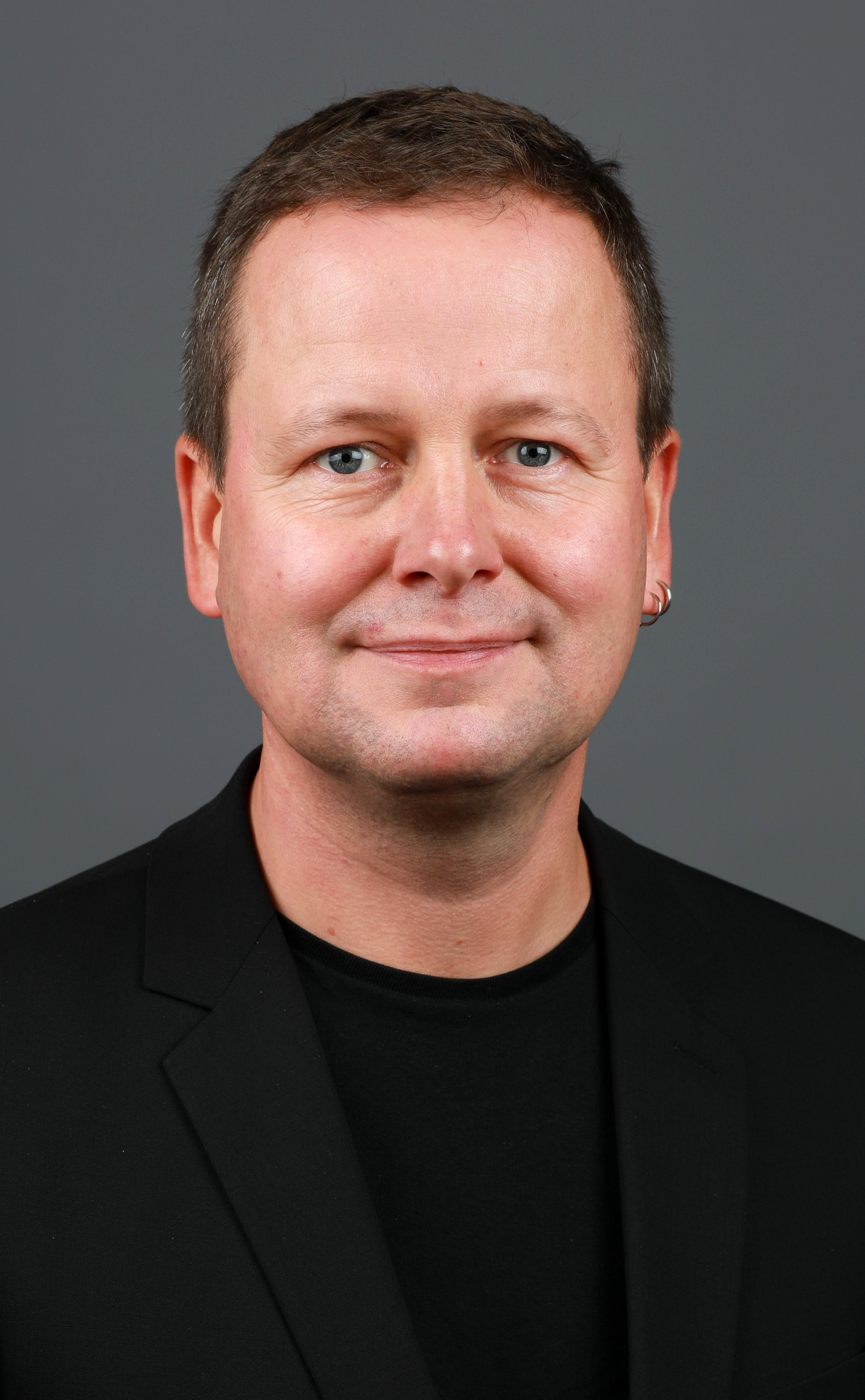

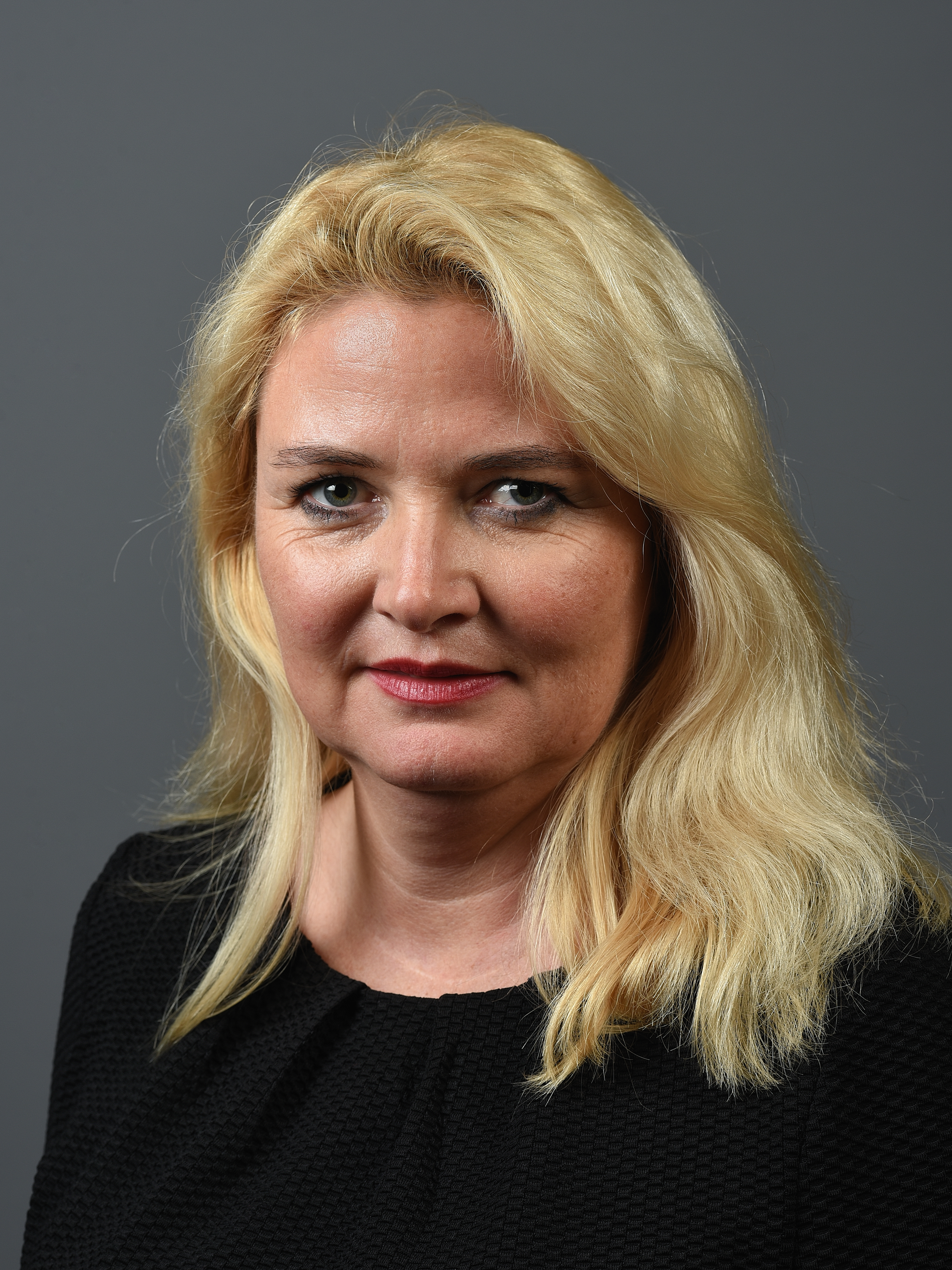

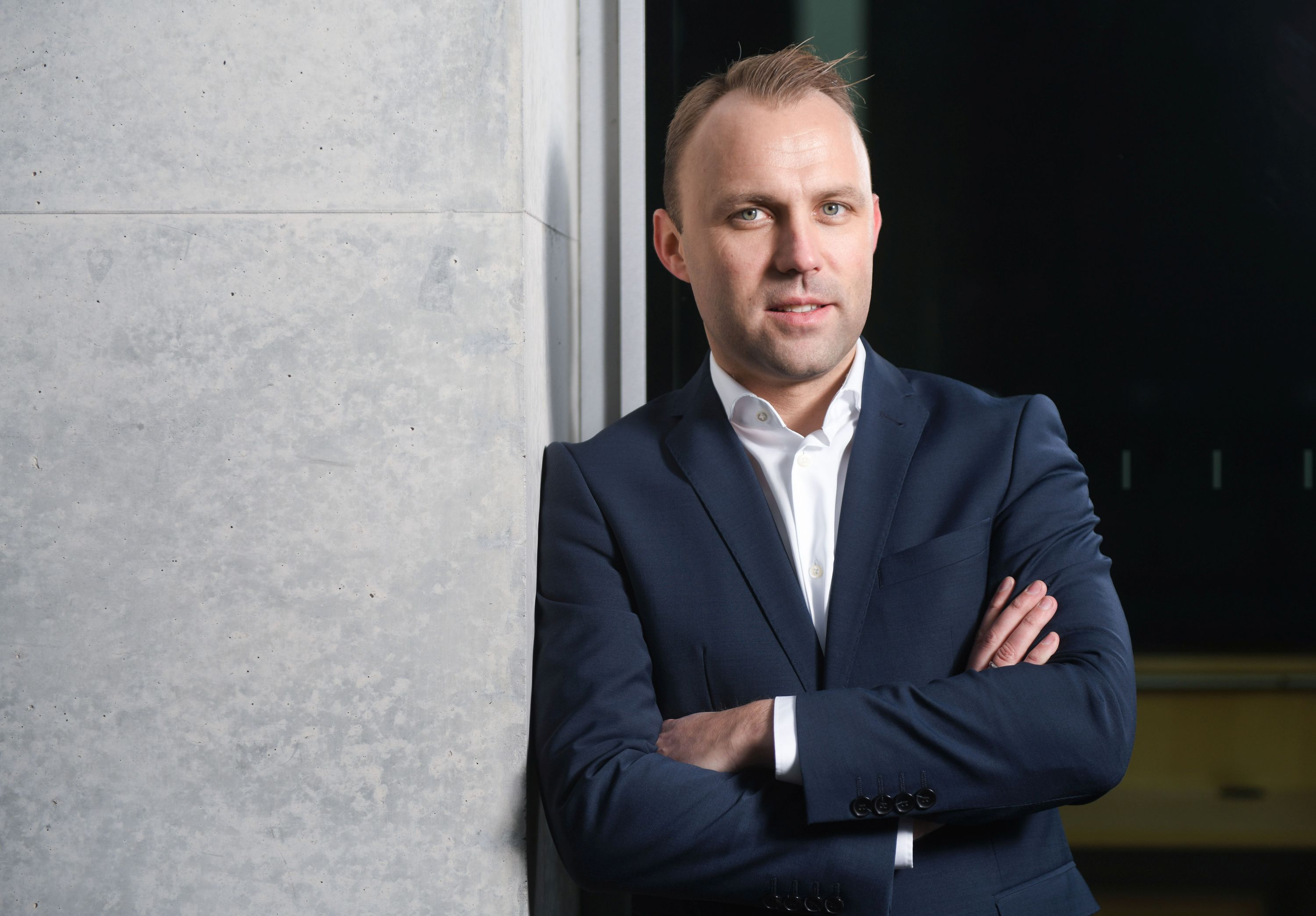
	First party	Second party	Third party
Candidate	Franziska Giffey	Bettina Jarasch	Kai Wegner
Party	SPD	Greens	CDU
Last election	38 seats, 21.6%	27 seats, 15.2%	31 seats, 17.6%
Seats won	36	32	30
Seat change	▼2	▲5	▼1
Popular vote	390,329	343,871	328,587
Percentage	21.4%	18.9%	18.0%
Swing	▼0.1 pp	▲3.7 pp	▲0.4 pp
	Fourth party	Fifth party	Sixth party
Candidate	Klaus Lederer	Kristin Brinker	Sebastian Czaja
Party	Left	AfD	FDP
Last election	27 seats, 15.6%	25 seats, 14.2%	12 seats, 6.7%
Seats won	24	13	12
Seat change	▼3	▼12	0
Popular vote	256,063	145,712	130,201
Percentage	14.1%	8.0%	7.1%
Swing	▼1.6 pp	▼6.2 pp	▲0.5 pp
Government before election
Second Müller senate
SPD–Left–Green
Government after election
Giffey senate
SPD–Green–Left

The 2021 Berlin state election, ruled invalid in 2022 and repeated in 2023, was held on 26 September 2021, on the same day as the 2021 German federal election, which also had to be repeated in parts of Berlin due to irregularities. Thus, the 19th Abgeordnetenhaus of Berlin was elected twice.

The incumbent government was a red-red-green coalition of the Social Democratic Party (SPD), The Left, and The Greens led by Governing Mayor Michael Müller. Müller did not run for re-election as Mayor, and former federal minister Franziska Giffey led the SPD in the election. The Berlin expropriation referendum was held on the same day, as well as the Borough council elections who function as the municipal elections of Berlin.

The SPD remained the largest party with 21.4% of votes cast, recording minimal change compared to 2016. The Greens narrowly surpassed the opposition Christian Democratic Union (CDU) to become the second largest party with 19% of the vote. The Left recorded a small decline to 14%, while the Alternative for Germany (AfD) lost almost half its vote share and finished on 8%. The Free Democratic Party (FDP) remained the smallest party in the Abgeordnetenhaus with 7%.

Post-election, SPD's Giffey and Bettina Jarasch of the Greens both spoke out in favour of a coalition involving their parties. They ultimately renewed the outgoing government with The Left. Franziska Giffey was elected as Governing Mayor on 21 December and her cabinet was sworn in the same day.

Due to numerous irregularities that took place during the election, the Constitutional Court of the State of Berlin annulled the results in November 2022. As a result, repeat elections were scheduled for the next year.

== Election date ==
The last election took place on 18 September 2016. The Abgeordnetenhaus has a term of five years, so the next regular elections must take place no later than September 2021. Federal Minister of the Interior Horst Seehofer recommended that the election take place on the same date as the 2021 German federal election, which took place on 26 September 2021.

== Electoral system ==
The Abgeordnetenhaus is elected via mixed-member proportional representation. 78 members are elected in single-member constituencies via first-past-the-post voting. 52 members are then allocated using compensatory proportional representation, distributed in each of Berlin's twelve boroughs. German voters have two votes: the "first vote" for candidates in single-member constituencies, and the "second vote" for party lists, which are used to fill the proportional seats. The minimum size of the Abgeordnetenhaus is 130 members, but if overhang seats are present, proportional leveling seats will be added to ensure proportionality. An electoral threshold of 5% of valid votes is applied to the Abgeordnetenhaus; parties that fall below this threshold are excluded from the Abgeordnetenhaus. However, parties which win at least one single-member constituency are exempt from the threshold and will be allocated seats proportionally, even if they fall below 5%.

== Background ==
In the previous election held on 13 March 2016, the SPD remained the largest party with 21.6% of the vote, a loss of 6.7 percentage points. The Christian Democratic Union (CDU) was the second largest party with 17.6%, a loss of 5.7 points. The Left overtook The Greens to become the third largest party on 15.6%, while The Greens won 15.2%. Alternative for Germany (AfD) contested their first election in Berlin, winning 14.2%. The Free Democratic Party (FDP) re-entered the Abgeordnetenhaus with 6.7%.

The SPD had led a coalition with the CDU since 2011, but this government lost its majority in the election. The SPD subsequently formed a coalition with The Left and The Greens.

== Parties ==
The table below lists parties currently represented in the 18th Abgeordnetenhaus of Berlin.

Name		Ideology	Lead candidate	Leader(s)	2016 result	
Name		Ideology	Lead candidate	Leader(s)	Votes (%)	Seats
SPD	Social Democratic Party of Germany; Sozialdemokratische Partei Deutschlands	Social democracy	Franziska Giffey	Franziska Giffey; Raed Saleh	21.6%	38 / 160
CDU	Christian Democratic Union of Germany; Christlich Demokratische Union Deutschlands	Christian democracy	Kai Wegner	Kai Wegner	17.6%	31 / 160
Linke	The Left; Die Linke	Democratic socialism	Klaus Lederer	Katina Schubert	15.6%	27 / 160
Grüne	Alliance 90/The Greens; Bündnis 90/Die Grünen	Green politics	Bettina Jarasch	Nina Stahr; Werner Graf	15.2%	27 / 160
AfD	Alternative for Germany; Alternative für Deutschland	Right-wing populism	Kristin Brinker	Kristin Brinker	14.2%	25 / 160
FDP	Free Democratic Party; Freie Demokratische Partei	Classical liberalism	Sebastian Czaja	Christoph Meyer	6.7%	12 / 160

== Campaign ==
=== Lead candidates ===
On 5 October 2020, the Greens nominated Bettina Jarasch, spokeswoman for integration and refugees, as their lead candidate for the election. She previously served as chairwoman of the state party from 2011 to 2016. She was formally elected as lead candidate on 12 December.

On 9 October, state CDU leader Kai Wegner was selected as his party's lead candidate.

Prior to the election, incumbent mayor Michael Müller voiced his desire to move into federal politics rather than seek another term. On 30 November 2020, the state party executive nominated Federal Minister for Family Affairs, Senior Citizens, Women and Youth Franziska Giffey as lead candidate for the election. She was simultaneously elected co-leader of the Berlin branch of the party alongside parliamentary group leader Raed Saleh.

On 8 December, The Left nominated incumbent Deputy Mayor and Senator for Culture Klaus Lederer as its lead candidate for the election. Lederer is noted as one of the most popular politicians in Berlin, achieving consistently high approval ratings.

On 27 March 2021, the FDP elected parliamentary group leader Sebastian Czaja as their lead candidate for the election.

== Opinion polling ==
=== Graphical summary ===
Local regression of polls conducted.

=== Party polling ===
Polling firm	Fieldwork date	Sample size	SPD	CDU	Linke	Grüne	AfD	FDP	Others	Lead
2021 state election	26 Sep 2021	–	21.4	18.0	14.1	18.9	8.0	7.1	12.5	2.5
INSA	22–24 Sep 2021	1,000	23	15	14	17	11	8	12 (Note: Free Voters 3%, Tierschutzpartei 3%, Others 6%)	6
Wahlkreisprognose	22–23 Sep 2021	1,040	25	15.5	14.5	15.5	10.5	7.5	12	9.5
Forschungsgruppe Wahlen	20–22 Sep 2021	1,103	22	17	13	19	9	7	13	3
Forschungsgruppe Wahlen	13–16 Sep 2021	1,000	21	17	12	20	9	8	13	1
Infratest dimap	13–15 Sep 2021	1,510	24	16	13	18	10	7	12 (Note: Tierschutzpartei 3%, Others 9%)	6
Wahlkreisprognose	9–14 Sep 2021	1,553	25	14.5	14.5	14.5	10.5	8.5	12.5	10.5
Wahlkreisprognose	23–24 Aug 2021	1,050	24.5	15	15	15.5	11	9.5	9.5	9
Infratest dimap	18–21 Aug 2021	1,160	23	19	12	17	11	8	10	4
INSA	16–23 Aug 2021	1,000	22	16	15	18	12	9	8 (Note: Free Voters 3%, Others 5%)	4
Forsa	5–10 Aug 2021	2,007	21	17	14	21	10	7	10	Tie
Wahlkreisprognose	24–31 Jul 2021	2,420	24	18	15	15.5	9	9	9.5	6
Wahlkreisprognose	29 Jun–6 Jul 2021	2,950	21	20	14	16	9.5	10.5	9.5	1
INSA	16–22 Jun 2021	1,000	18	18	13	22	12	10	7 (Note: Free Voters 2%, Others 5%)	3
Infratest dimap	9–14 Jun 2021	1,198	17	21	12	22	10	9	9	1
Wahlkreisprognose	3–10 Jun 2021	1,553	20.5	18	13	16	8.5	12.5	11.5 (Note: PARTEI 5%, Others 6.5%)	2.5
INSA	11–17 May 2021	1,000	20	16	13	25	12	9	5 (Note: Free Voters 3%, Others 2%)	5
Infratest dimap	20–24 Apr 2021	?	17	18	14	27	9	7	8	9
INSA	12–20 Apr 2021	1,024	19	16	14	25	12	10	4	6
Infratest dimap	16–20 Feb 2021	1,007	18	22	15	23	9	6	7	1
INSA	11–18 Dec 2020	1,002	18	22	16	18	12	7	7	4
INSA	28 Sep–5 Oct 2020	1,007	18	21	16	20	12	6	7	1
Infratest dimap	15–19 Sep 2020	1,001	15	22	15	26	10	6	6	4
INSA	7–13 Jul 2020	1,012	16	21	18	19	12	5	9	2
Infratest dimap	22–25 Apr 2020	1,002	20	23	14	21	10	5	7	2
Forsa	29 Jan–6 Feb 2020	1,011	15	16	17	25	11	6	10	8
INSA	10–18 Dec 2019	1,006	15	18	19	23	13	7	5	4
Forsa	12–19 Dec 2019	1,005	15	17	19	22	11	6	10	3
Forsa	21–28 Nov 2019	1,006	16	17	17	25	11	5	10	8
Infratest dimap	11–16 Nov 2019	1,003	16	18	17	23	14	5	7	5
Forsa	22–31 Oct 2019	1,002	15	18	16	25	11	5	10	7
Forsa	17–26 Sep 2019	1,002	16	17	16	24	11	6	10	7
INSA	10–16 Sep 2019	1,018	15	17	18	24	14	6	6	6
Forsa	20–29 Aug 2019	1,003	16	16	17	24	11	6	10	7
Forsa	17–25 Jul 2019	1,001	16	17	18	25	10	5	9	7
Forsa	17–27 Jun 2019	1,004	15	17	17	25	10	7	9	8
Forsa	20–27 May 2019	1,006	16	15	17	26	11	7	8	9
Infratest dimap	30 Apr–3 May 2019	1,000	15	17	19	23	10	6	10	4
Forsa	16–25 Apr 2019	1,005	16	17	18	25	11	7	6	7
INSA	5–8 Apr 2019	1,030	16	19	19	19	12	9	6	Tie
INSA	19–28 Mar 2019	1,003	15	18	18	25	10	8	6	7
Forsa	20–28 Feb 2019	1,001	17	20	18	22	11	7	5	2
Forsa	22–31 Jan 2019	1,002	16	19	20	21	11	8	5	1
Forsa	11–19 Dec 2018	1,009	15	17	18	23	13	7	7	5
INSA	10–17 Dec 2018	1,007	16	18	16	21	14	8	7	3
Forsa	19–29 Nov 2018	1,003	15	18	18	23	13	7	6	5
Infratest dimap	14–17 Nov 2018	1,002	15	18	18	24	13	6	6	6
INSA	23 Oct–2 Nov 2018	1,019	16	16	17	22	15	7	7	5
Forsa	October 2018	1,005	15	16	19	22	13	8	7	3
Forsa	19–27 Sep 2018	1,005	16	17	22	18	13	7	7	4
Forsa	21–30 Aug 2018	1,004	17	19	21	18	12	6	7	2
Forsa	16–26 Jul 2018	1,009	17	19	21	17	13	7	6	2
INSA	9–16 Jul 2018	1,012	17	18	17	18	14	7	9	Tie
Forsa	20–28 Jun 2018	1,009	19	18	21	16	11	8	7	2
Forsa	22–31 May 2018	1,004	18	19	20	18	11	7	7	1
Infratest dimap	9–12 May 2018	1,000	18	21	22	15	11	6	7	1
Forsa	17–26 Apr 2018	1,001	19	19	19	18	11	7	7	Tie
INSA	3–9 Apr 2018	1,039	19	19	19	17	13	8	5	Tie
Forsa	19–28 Mar 2018	1,003	20	20	18	17	12	7	6	Tie
Forsa	12–22 Feb 2018	1,006	19	19	20	18	12	6	6	1
Forsa	15–25 Jan 2018	1,008	20	19	18	17	11	7	8	1
Forsa	12–21 Dec 2017	1,002	20	20	18	17	11	6	8	Tie
Forsa	13–23 Nov 2017	1,002	18	21	18	16	11	8	8	3
Forsa	17–26 Oct 2017	1,011	19	20	18	14	11	9	9	1
Forsa	26 Sep–5 Oct 2017	1,002	18	19	19	15	11	9	9	Tie
Infratest dimap	6–9 Sep 2017	1,000	21	23	19	14	10	7	6	2
Forsa	22–30 Aug 2017	1,005	19	21	17	14	9	11	9	2
Forsa	18–27 Jul 2017	1,007	20	22	18	14	8	9	9	2
Forsa	22–29 Jun 2017	1,003	21	22	17	14	8	9	9	1
Forsa	16–24 May 2017	1,001	22	23	16	13	8	8	10	1
Infratest dimap	17–20 May 2017	1,000	22	24	17	13	10	8	6	2
Forsa	19–27 Apr 2017	1,002	24	20	16	12	9	8	11	4
Forsa	20–30 Mar 2017	1,005	25	20	16	13	8	7	11	5
Forsa	13–23 Mar 2017	1,004	25	17	16	13	10	8	11	8
Forsa	16–26 Jan 2017	1,008	20	20	16	15	12	8	9	Tie
Forsa	12–23 Dec 2016	1,003	20	20	17	16	12	7	8	Tie
Forsa	14–24 Nov 2017	1,001	19	20	16	17	13	7	8	1
Infratest dimap	21–23 Nov 2016	1,003	21	19	17	15	13	7	8	2
Forsa	19–27 Oct 2016	1,002	20	18	16	16	13	7	10	2
2016 state election	18 Sep 2016	–	21.6	17.6	15.6	15.2	14.2	6.7	7.4	4.0

=== West Berlin ===
Polling firm	Fieldwork date	Sample size	SPD	CDU	Grüne	Linke	FDP	AfD	Others	Lead
2021 state election	12 Feb 2021	–	22.9	20.8	20.3	10.1	7.9	6.3	11.7	2.1
Infratest dimap	25.08.2021	–	25	21	19	9	9	9	8	4
Infratest dimap	16.06.2021	–	19	23	24	7	10	8	9	1
Infratest dimap	28.04.2021	–	18	21	28	10	8	8	7	7
Infratest dimap	24.02.2021	–	19	25	24	10	8	8	6	1
Infratest dimap	23.09.2020	–	14	25	30	10	8	8	5	5
Infratest dimap	29.04.2020	–	20	25	23	11	6	8	7	2
Infratest dimap	20.11.2019	–	18	20	26	12	5	12	7	6
Infratest dimap	08.05.2019	–	17	20	27	13	6	8	9	7
Infratest dimap	21.11.2018	–	15	21	27	12	8	11	6	6
Infratest dimap	16.05.2018	–	20	23	18	16	7	10	6	3
Infratest dimap	12.09.2017	–	23	25	15	13	8	10	6	2
Infratest dimap	23.05.2017	–	23	24	15	13	10	10	5	1
Infratest dimap	24.11.2016	–	23	22	17	11	8	12	7	1

=== East Berlin ===
Polling firm	Fieldwork date	Sample size	SPD	Linke	Grüne	CDU	AfD	FDP	Others	Lead
2021 state election	12 Feb 2021	–	19.4	19.4	17.0	14.3	10.3	6.1	13.5	0.0
Infratest dimap	25.08.2021	–	21	17	14	15	15	6	12	4
Infratest dimap	16.06.2021	–	14	19	19	18	13	8	9	Tie
Infratest dimap	28.04.2021	–	15	19	26	14	12	6	8	7
Infratest dimap	24.02.2021	–	15	22	21	18	11	5	8	1
Infratest dimap	23.09.2020	–	15	23	20	18	12	5	7	3
Infratest dimap	29.04.2020	–	19	19	18	20	13	3	8	1
Infratest dimap	20.11.2019	–	14	24	18	16	16	5	7	6
Infratest dimap	08.05.2019	–	13	28	16	14	13	5	11	12
Infratest dimap	21.11.2018	–	15	27	20	12	15	4	7	7
Infratest dimap	16.05.2018	–	16	29	11	18	14	5	7	11
Infratest dimap	12.09.2017	–	19	26	13	21	11	4	6	7
Infratest dimap	23.05.2017	–	22	22	10	23	10	6	7	1
Infratest dimap	24.11.2016	–	19	25	12	14	15	5	10	6
2016 state election	18 Sep 2016	–	19.3	23.4	12.6	13.1	17.0	4.0	10.7	4.1

== Results ==
Results of the party list vote by voting precinct (Wahlbezirk).

Party	Constituency				Party list				Total seats	+/–
Party	Votes	%	+/–	Seats	Votes	%	+/–	Seats	Total seats	+/–
Social Democratic Party (SPD)	422,754	23.36	–1.43	25	390,329	21.43	–0.13	11	36	–2
Alliance 90/The Greens (GRÜNE)	361,636	19.99	+4.23	24	343,871	18.88	+3.69	8	32	+5
Christian Democratic Union (CDU)	355,696	19.66	–0.17	21	328,587	18.04	+0.43	9	30	–1
The Left (LINKE)	252,470	13.95	–1.48	6	256,063	14.06	–1.58	18	24	–3
Alternative for Germany (AfD)	146,091	8.07	–6.05	2	145,712	8.00	–6.16	11	13	–12
Free Democratic Party (FDP)	119,226	6.59	+1.03	0	130,201	7.15	+0.45	12	12	0
Human Environment Animal Protection Party	60,990	3.37	+3.37	0	40,128	2.20	+0.33	0	0	0
Die PARTEI	36,305	2.01	+0.79	0	32,800	1.80	–0.15	0	0	0
Grassroots Democratic Party	29,770	1.65	New	0	23,055	1.27	New	0	0	New
Volt Germany					20,205	1.11	New	0	0	New
Team Todenhöfer					18,853	1.03	New	0	0	New
Free Voters	16,897	0.93	New	0	15,297	0.84	New	0	0	New
The Greys					12,654	0.69	New	0	0	New
Grey Panthers					8,910	0.49	–0.62	0	0	0
Animal Protection Here!					8,059	0.44	New	0	0	New
Climate List Berlin					7,899	0.43	New	0	0	New
Pirate Party Germany	1,671	0.09	–1.89	0	7,440	0.41	–1.32	0	0	0
Party for Health Research					4,887	0.27	–0.21	0	0	0
Renters' Party	1,079	0.06	+±0.00	0	4,261	0.23	+0.23	0	0	0
The Humanists					3,880	0.21	New	0	0	New
The Urbans. A HipHop Party	698	0.04	New	0	3,587	0.20	New	0	0	New
Ecological Democratic Party	1,072	0.06	+0.05	0	2,446	0.13	+0.12	0	0	0
Bildet Berlin!					2,486	0.14	New	0	0	New
National Democratic Party	852	0.05	–0.27	0	2,349	0.13	–0.45	0	0	0
German Communist Party					2,359	0.13	–0.08	0	0	0
Bergpartei, die "ÜberPartei"					1,713	0.09	+0.06	0	0	0
Liberal Conservative Reformers	979	0.05	+0.04	0	1,263	0.07	–0.34	0	0	0
The Pinks/Alliance 21	74	0.00	New	0	970	0.05	New	0	0	New
Civil Rights Movement Solidarity					575	0.03	–0.05	0	0	0
Socialist Equality Party					492	0.03	New	0	0	New
Human World					174	0.01	–0.04	0	0	0
The New Democrats					95	0.01	New	0	0	New
The Republicans	18	0.00	New	0	55	0.00	New	0	0	New
German Conservative					9	0.00	New	0	0	New
The Women	120	0.01	New	0					0	New
Liberal Democrats	28	0.00	New	0					0	New
Democratic Left	21	0.00	–0.00	0					0	0
Independents	1,039	0.06	–0.21	0					0	0
Total	1,809,486	100.00	–	78	1,821,664	100.00	–	69	147	-13
Total votes	1,844,278	–	–		1,844,278	–	–			
Registered voters/turnout	2,447,600	75.35	+8.46		2,447,600	75.35	+8.46			
Source: State Returning Officer

Popular vote
SPD	21.43%
GRÜNE	18.88%
CDU	18.04%
LINKE	14.06%
AfD	8.00%
FDP	7.15%
Other	12.46%

Abgeordnetenhaus seats
SPD	24.49%
GRÜNE	21.77%
CDU	20.41%
LINKE	16.33%
AfD	8.84%
FDP	8.16%

	SPD	CDU/CSU	Linke	Grüne	FDP	AfD	Others
West Berlin	22.9	20.8	10.1	20.3	7.9	6.3	11.3
East Berlin	19.4	14.3	19.4	16.9	6.1	10.4	13.5

=== By constituency ===
Constituency	Personal vote							List vote						
Constituency	Previous member	Elected member	Votes	%	Margin	Runner-up	%	SPD	Grüne	CDU	Linke	AfD	FDP	Other
Mitte 1	Ramona Pop	Silke Gebel	8,680	35.2	4,374	Astrid Hollmann	17.5	15.4	31.3	13.4	14.2	3.4	10.9	11.3
Mitte 2	Carola Bluhm	Max Landero	5,555	21.8	305	Stefan Lehmkühler	20.7	19.7	19.6	14.6	20.7	6.0	8.8	10.6
Mitte 3	Thomas Isenberg	Jian Omar	7,208	31.9	2,231	Thomas Isenberg	22.0	20.0	28.3	15.0	13.5	3.9	8.1	11.2
Mitte 4	Marc Urbatsch	Taylan Kurt	7,832	36.9	3,961	Stephan Rauhut	18.2	16.7	32.3	9.2	18.2	4.0	5.5	14.1
Mitte 5	Bruni Wildenhein-Lauterbach	Mathias Schulz	4,765	25.6	648	Ario Mirzaie	22.1	22.8	20.5	14.0	15.7	7.6	5.1	14.2
Mitte 6	Ralf Wieland	Tuba Bozkurt	5,091	29.8	1,290	Stephan Böhme	22.2	17.5	26.2	8.2	22.8	4.8	4.3	16.3
Mitte 7	Maja Lasić	Laura Neugebauer	5,179	28.1	790	Maja Lasić	23.8	19.9	25.0	10.0	18.6	5.0	5.3	16.2
Friedrichshain-Kreuzberg 1	Katrin Schmidberger	Katrin Schmidberger	9,153	41.2	5,010	Hannah Lupper	18.6	16.9	36.3	8.3	19.2	2.2	5.0	12.2
Friedrichshain-Kreuzberg 2	Marianne Burkert-Eulitz	Marianne Burkert-Eulitz	7,833	38.8	2,206	Elif Eralp	27.9	12.9	37.3	5.1	26.4	1.9	3.3	13.1
Friedrichshain-Kreuzberg 3	Turgut Altuğ	Turgut Altuğ	7,010	35.0	2,938	Ali Reza Amiri	20.4	17.5	30.9	7.7	22.7	2.7	3.6	14.8
Friedrichshain-Kreuzberg 4	Steffen Zillich	Damiano Valgolio	5,326	24.7	211	Monika Herrmann	23.8	18.2	21.7	10.3	25.3	5.8	5.7	12.8
Friedrichshain-Kreuzberg 5	Daniela Billig	Vasili Franco	8,109	34.7	2,327	Steffen Zillich	24.8	12.9	32.5	6.8	25.4	3.3	4.8	14.5
Friedrichshain-Kreuzberg 6	New seat	Julian Schwarze	8,988	38.6	3,747	Kerstin Wolter	22.5	12.3	35.2	7.1	23.1	2.9	5.9	13.5
Pankow 1	Christian Buchholz	Johannes Kraft	6,390	25.4	1,104	Willi Francke	21.0	21.7	10.3	19.7	13.7	14.0	7.0	13.6
Pankow 2	Torsten Hofer	Torsten Hofer	5,692	22.6	510	Lars Bocian	20.6	21.4	15.1	18.8	13.4	11.0	7.5	12.8
Pankow 3	Torsten Schneider	Oda Hassepaß	6,190	23.8	24	Klaus Lederer	23.7	19.3	23.5	11.9	19.3	7.5	5.6	12.9
Pankow 4	Dennis Buchner	Dennis Buchner	5,149	24.1	1,208	Dirk Stettner	18.4	22.1	13.3	17.0	16.4	11.8	6.1	13.3
Pankow 5	Udo Wolf	Louis Krüger	5,036	21.9	180	Katrin Seidel	21.1	19.6	20.6	11.6	20.4	8.4	4.9	14.5
Pankow 6	Andreas Otto	Andreas Otto	10,451	41.3	5,204	Katja Rom	20.8	13.0	37.7	6.9	21.9	2.8	5.7	12.1
Pankow 7	Clara West	Julia Schneider	7,136	30.7	2,452	Sandra Brunner	20.2	16.3	27.4	9.1	21.4	6.4	5.6	13.8
Pankow 8	Stefan Gelbhaar	Daniela Billig	9,108	38.2	4,437	Janine Walter	19.6	13.3	35.2	8.7	20.5	3.2	7.2	11.8
Pankow 9	Tino Schopf	Tino Schopf	6,878	27.4	740	Stefanie Remlinger	24.5	18.9	25.1	10.6	20.6	6.5	5.6	12.8
Charlottenburg-Wilmersdorf 1	Fréderic Verrycken	Christian Hochgrebe	5,466	27.6	1,216	Jana Brix	21.5	24.4	20.3	17.4	9.4	7.3	8.2	13.0
Charlottenburg-Wilmersdorf 2	Andreas Statzkowski	Ariturel Hack	7,007	28.9	1,379	Alexander Sempf	23.2	22.7	19.7	25.8	6.8	4.9	11.5	8.6
Charlottenburg-Wilmersdorf 3	Ülker Radziwill	Petra Vandrey	7,555	31.0	1,789	Ülker Radziwill	23.6	21.7	28.5	15.5	11.4	3.8	8.6	10.5
Charlottenburg-Wilmersdorf 4	Frank Jahnke	Christoph Wapler	6,564	27.0	583	Reinhard Naumann	24.6	22.0	25.1	18.7	8.9	4.0	11.5	9.7
Charlottenburg-Wilmersdorf 5	Claudio Jupe	Sandra Khalatbari	7,000	30.0	1,756	Claudia Buß	22.5	21.2	17.6	27.8	6.4	5.0	14.0	8.1
Charlottenburg-Wilmersdorf 6	Franziska Becker	Alexander Kaas Elias	6,403	26.4	19	Franziska Becker	26.3	22.7	25.5	19.2	9.3	3.9	9.4	10.0
Charlottenburg-Wilmersdorf 7	Florian Dörstelmann	Florian Dörstelmann	6,681	26.2	526	Stefanie Bung	24.1	23.8	21.8	22.0	8.3	5.0	9.3	9.9
Spandau 1	Bettina Domer	Sebahat Atli	6,346	28.7	752	Bettina Meißner	25.3	26.4	10.8	24.4	5.9	11.0	7.2	14.2
Spandau 2	Raed Saleh	Raed Saleh	6,073	32.3	2,114	Ersin Nas	21.1	27.5	11.6	21.5	6.7	11.0	6.9	14.8
Spandau 3	Daniel Buchholz	Stephan Machulik	6,288	29.2	1,488	Kerstin Brauner	22.3	25.2	13.4	22.4	7.0	9.7	7.5	14.8
Spandau 4	Heiko Melzer	Heiko Melzer	6,892	31.2	485	Hannah Erez-Hübner	29.0	26.6	9.2	29.9	4.6	10.5	7.7	11.5
Spandau 5	Peter Trapp	Kai Wegner	8,970	36.5	2,817	Uwe Ziesak	25.0	23.3	13.0	33.0	4.2	8.1	9.1	9.2
Steglitz-Zehlendorf 1	Andreas Kugler	Benedikt Lux	7,376	28.9	2,817	Andreas Kugler	23.8	22.7	24.6	19.5	8.5	4.6	9.2	10.9
Steglitz-Zehlendorf 2	Matthias Kollatz-Ahnen	Matthias Kollatz-Ahnen	6,519	27.9	1,307	Tonka Wojahn	22.3	24.4	21.3	20.0	8.1	5.6	9.2	11.4
Steglitz-Zehlendorf 3	Christian Goiny	Christian Goiny	8,611	31.3	2,188	Martin Matz	23.3	22.3	20.5	27.4	5.2	4.7	11.8	8.2
Steglitz-Zehlendorf 4	Cornelia Seibeld	Cornelia Seibeld	7,178	31.7	2,188	Carolyn Macmillan	25.7	24.4	16.0	28.3	5.1	6.3	10.1	9.7
Steglitz-Zehlendorf 5	Oliver Friederici	Oliver Friederici	6,493	29.4	812	Mirjam Golm	25.7	24.9	14.3	26.0	5.6	7.6	9.9	11.7
Steglitz-Zehlendorf 6	Adrian Grasse	Adrian Grasse	8,025	31.0	2,247	Ina Czyborra	22.4	20.5	20.8	27.6	6.3	4.3	12.2	8.3
Steglitz-Zehlendorf 7	Stephan Standfuß	Stephan Standfuß	7,787	30.7	2,137	Susanne Mertens	22.3	20.2	19.9	28.9	4.7	4.2	14.1	8.1
Tempelhof-Schöneberg 1	Notker Schweikhardt	Sebastian Walter	8,552	33.2	2,606	Wiebke Neumann	23.1	20.5	29.9	13.8	13.7	3.7	7.1	11.2
Tempelhof-Schöneberg 2	Catherina Pieroth-Manelli	Catherina Pieroth-Manelli	9,121	35.9	2,997	Michael Biel	24.1	19.8	33.0	10.6	15.3	3.3	5.4	12.5
Tempelhof-Schöneberg 3	Dilek Kalayci	Orkan Özdemir	8,838	32.1	999	Annabelle Wolfsturm	28.5	22.4	30.8	15.4	10.4	3.5	7.2	10.2
Tempelhof-Schöneberg 4	Michael Müller	Aferdita Suka	6,267	25.7	421	Jens Fischwasser	24.0	21.9	23.1	17.3	11.9	5.4	6.5	13.9
Tempelhof-Schöneberg 5	Frank Zimmermann	Lars Rauchfuß	6,460	28.0	389	Roman Simon	26.3	25.6	13.3	24.5	7.2	7.9	7.7	13.8
Tempelhof-Schöneberg 6	Florian Graf	Scott Körber	7,658	33.1	1,518	Sinem Taşan-Funke	26.5	25.2	10.6	30.9	4.5	9.1	9.0	10.7
Tempelhof-Schöneberg 7	Hildegard Bentele	Christian Zander	8,727	35.6	2,722	Melanie Kühnemann-Grunow	24.5	23.6	10.6	33.9	4.2	8.7	8.6	10.4
Neukölln 1	Anja Kofbinger	André Schulze	7,958	33.8	1,703	Lucy Redler	26.6	16.9	32.1	5.6	26.4	3.0	2.7	13.2
Neukölln 2	Susanna Kahlefeld	Susanna Kahlefeld	7,429	32.9	630	Jorinde Schulz	30.1	16.9	31.9	5.1	26.9	3.1	2.5	13.6
Neukölln 3	Joschka Langenbrinck	Derya Çağlar	5,571	27.2	630	Georg Kössler	20.5	25.6	19.8	10.5	19.2	5.9	4.0	15.1
Neukölln 4	Derya Çağlar	Marcel Hopp	7,746	36.1	1,943	Christopher Förster	27.1	36.3	6.1	23.7	5.2	10.3	6.4	12.0
Neukölln 5	Robbin Juhnke	Nina Lerch	7,333	30.3	392	Robbin Juhnke	28.7	33.1	9.4	24.8	5.0	9.2	7.3	11.3
Neukölln 6	Karin Korte	Franziska Giffey	9,771	40.8	3,116	Olaf Schenk	27.8	34.2	6.9	26.7	4.1	10.5	7.3	10.4
Treptow-Köpenick 1	Katalin Gennburg	Katalin Gennburg	7,005	26.2	1,666	Alexander Freier-Winterwerb	20.0	18.7	20.6	9.8	23.1	8.5	4.8	14.5
Treptow-Köpenick 2	Lars Düsterhöft	Lars Düsterhöft	8,156	31.4	3,197	Philipp Wohlfeil	19.1	24.0	12.7	11.6	19.1	11.5	5.9	15.3
Treptow-Köpenick 3	Frank Scholtysek	Ellen Haußdörfer	5,952	22.9	1,314	Stefan Evers	17.8	21.7	9.8	16.7	14.8	14.9	7.3	14.7
Treptow-Köpenick 4	Robert Schaddach	Robert Schaddach	7,292	26.6	2,728	André Schubert	16.7	21.4	12.1	15.8	17.3	12.0	7.9	13.5
Treptow-Köpenick 5	Tom Schreiber	Tom Schreiber	5,780	26.0	1,680	Stefanie Fuchs	18.4	23.1	8.5	15.0	17.9	14.6	7.0	13.9
Treptow-Köpenick 6	Carsten Schatz	Dunja Wolff	5,909	22.0	441	Carsten Schatz	20.4	21.2	13.5	16.5	19.6	10.4	6.8	11.8
Marzahn-Hellersdorf 1	Gunnar Lindemann	Gunnar Lindemann	4,049	22.7	70	Gordon Lemm	22.3	20.1	5.3	12.7	18.6	21.7	5.2	16.3
Marzahn-Hellersdorf 2	Manuela Schmidt	Manuela Schmidt	5,156	24.0	140	Iris Spranger	23.4	23.1	5.5	15.6	20.9	17.2	4.7	13.1
Marzahn-Hellersdorf 3	Jessica Bießmann	Jeannette Auricht	4,335	22.0	250	Steffen Ostehr	20.8	19.9	5.4	13.9	18.3	20.9	4.9	16.8
Marzahn-Hellersdorf 4	Christian Gräff	Christian Gräff	9,278	35.5	4,399	Regina Kittler	18.7	17.5	7.9	27.5	18.3	12.5	4.7	11.5
Marzahn-Hellersdorf 5	Mario Czaja	Katharina Günther-Wünsch	9,461	33.5	4,251	Luise Lehmann	18.5	18.8	8.9	29.0	14.7	11.8	6.4	10.3
Marzahn-Hellersdorf 6	Kristian Ronneburg	Alexander J. Herrmann	5,541	27.9	1,860	Kristian Ronneburg	18.6	19.5	5.9	20.9	17.9	16.6	5.0	14.2
Lichtenberg 1	Kay Nerstheimer	Danny Freymark	5,635	25.5	1,475	Ines Schmidt	18.8	20.6	5.1	19.8	17.4	18.1	4.7	14.1
Lichtenberg 2	Wolfgang Albers	Martin Pätzold	5,055	21.3	77	Robert Schneider	21.0	21.0	8.0	18.8	19.4	13.7	6.3	12.9
Lichtenberg 3	Marion Platta	Claudia Engelmann	5,526	24.4	302	Karsten Strien	23.1	23.1	10.1	12.5	21.2	12.3	5.7	15.2
Lichtenberg 4	Sebastian Schlüsselburg	Sebastian Schlüsselburg	7,198	29.4	2,002	Tamara Lüdke	21.3	19.5	16.8	9.9	24.5	9.1	5.0	15.2
Lichtenberg 5	Hendrikje Klein	Hendrikje Klein	6,441	26.4	1,527	Patricia Holland-Moritz	20.1	20.1	15.3	10.4	23.1	10.3	5.0	15.8
Lichtenberg 6	Harald Wolf	Andreas Geisel	6,636	27.1	1,527	Norman Wolf	21.2	22.4	17.2	12.8	20.2	8.2	5.8	13.4
Reinickendorf 1	Burkard Dregger	Bettina König	4,820	27.2	592	Burkard Dregger	23.8	23.7	13.2	21.4	9.1	10.7	5.6	16.3
Reinickendorf 2	Emine Demirbüken-Wegner	Jörg Stroedter	5,031	26.8	61	Emine Demirbüken-Wegner	26.5	24.7	11.0	25.0	6.0	11.9	6.8	14.6
Reinickendorf 3	Stephan Schmidt	Stephan Schmidt	7,946	33.4	1,742	Nicola Böcker-Giannini	26.1	23.5	14.0	31.5	4.0	7.6	8.9	10.6
Reinickendorf 4	Tim Zeelen	Björn Wohlert	7,026	28.4	485	Sven Meyer	26.4	23.9	13.4	27.0	5.3	9.4	8.4	12.5
Reinickendorf 5	Michael Dietmann	Michael Dietmann	5,043	30.7	563	Sevda Boyraci	27.3	26.2	8.3	27.8	4.9	12.3	7.0	13.5
Reinickendorf 6	Jürn Jakob Schultze-Berndt	Frank Balzer	8,764	36.6	3,560	Kai Kottenstede	21.8	20.4	17.7	34.3	3.9	5.8	10.0	8.1
Berlin	N/A	N/A				N/A		21.4	18.9	18.0	14.1	8.0	7.1	12.5

== Aftermath ==
=== Government formation ===
The results showed that the next government would have to consist of three parties, in order to get a majority; all parties ruled out the possibility of working with the AfD. Before the results, the SPD's candidate Franziska Giffey had stated that she was looking to form a coalition involving the CDU and the FDP. Post-election, both the SPD's Giffey and Bettina Jarasch of the Greens spoke out in favour of a coalition involving their parties but differed on a third partner, as Giffey favoured a traffic light coalition with the FDP, while the Greens voiced their desire to renew the incumbent red–red–green coalition with The Left. Giffey faced resistance within her party for her stance. The SPD and Greens agreed to seek preliminary discussions with both the FDP and Left. On 14 October, Giffey announced that the SPD would enter coalition negotiations with the Greens and The Left.

The three parties finalised a coalition agreement on 28 November. It was approved by 91.5% of delegates at an SPD congress on 5 December. On, 12 December, it was passed by the Greens congress 96.4% approval. The Left carried out a membership ballot on the coalition pact. Most party representatives endorsed the agreement, though some, such as Katalin Gennburg, campaigned against it. The results were announced on 17 December, with 74.9% of members voting in favour of the agreement.

Giffey was elected as Governing Mayor by the Abgeordnetenhaus on 21 December, winning 84 votes out of 139 votes. The Giffey senate, comprising four SPD, three Green, three Left, and one independent senator, was sworn in the same day.

=== Irregularities and annulment ===
Numerous irregularities were reported during the elections in Berlin, including shortages of ballot papers, unusually long queues to vote, ballots being delivered to the wrong locations, and in some cases voters being turned away or offered only ballot papers for the federal election. Problems were exacerbated by a marathon taking place in the city on the same day. Irregularities were especially common in the Charlottenburg-Wilmersdorf and Friedrichshain districts. State electoral officer Petra Michaelis resigned three days after the election, taking responsibility for the failures in the election process. The state interior minister announced an inquiry into the events and stated that investigations would take place concerning incidents at approximately 100 of Berlin's 2,245 polling stations. This was later revised to 207 of 2,257 polling stations. Reviews and corrections are considered unlikely to change the overall results of the state or federal elections, but may affect the outcome of results in the Charlottenburg-Wilmersdorf 6 and Marzahn-Hellersdorf 1 constituencies for the state election. Preliminary results showed the SPD candidate ahead by 8 votes in Charlottenburg-Wilmersdorf 6; a recount saw the seat flip to the Greens by a margin of 23 votes. The new result was later certified by the electoral office.

On 22 November, the state electoral committee and interior ministry requested that the Constitutional Court of the State of Berlin rule on the validity of the election results in the Pankow 3, Charlottenburg-Wilmersdorf 6, and Marzahn-Hellersdorf 1 constituencies. The court may determine that a repeat of the elections is necessary in the affected constituencies; it is expected to take several months to deliver its verdict. The interior ministry clarified that, although irregularities were recorded in many constituencies, they were only significant enough to change the result in the three specified. Nonetheless, the state government plans to establish an expert committee to investigate the irregularities.

After months of investigation and hearings, on 28 September 2022, the Constitutional Court of the State of Berlin issued a preliminary assessment declaring that a full repeat of both the state and district council elections was likely necessary. The court handed down its official ruling on 16 November, voiding the results and mandating a new election within 90 days.The president of the court Ludgera Selting stated that the frequency and gravity of irregularities were severe enough to affect the outcome of the results, and that serious systemic flaws were present during preparation for the election.

The new election must take place within 90 days – 14 February 2023 at the latest. A likely date is Sunday 12 February. The repeat election will not reset the legislative period, meaning another full state election must still take place in 2026 or earlier.

In addition, the Election Audit Committee of the Bundestag reviewed the findings of the Berlin Constitutional Court to determine whether a repeat of the federal election was required in Berlin. On 7 November, the committee recommended that the elections be repeated in 431 affected polling stations. This was put forward by the governing coalition of the SPD, Greens, and FDP, who formed the majority in the committee. The CDU/CSU and AfD factions opposed this, insisting that a full repeat in the six affected constituencies should take place. The committee's recommendation was approved by the Bundestag on 10 November. Due to a differing process and anticipated legal challenges which could bring the issue before the Federal Constitutional Court, any repeat of the federal election in Berlin is unlikely to take place for a longer period of time, and may be delayed to 2024.

== See also ==
- 2021 Berlin referendum
