= Anne Helm (politician) =

German politician and voice actress (born 1986)

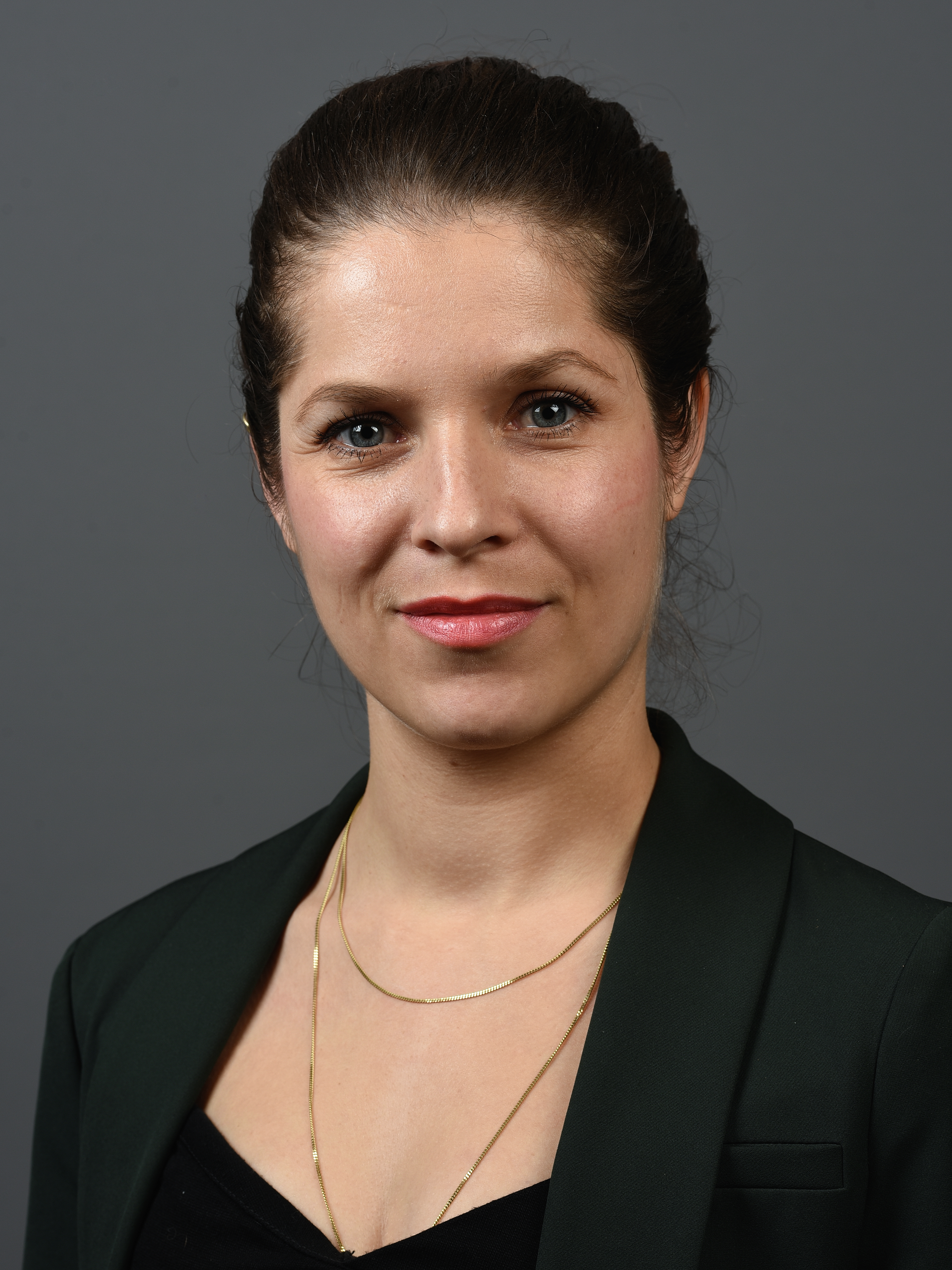
- Helm in 2017

Leader of The Left in the Abgeordnetenhaus of Berlin
- Incumbent
- Assumed office 2 July 2020 Serving with Carsten Schatz
- Preceded by: Carola Bluhm

Member of the Abgeordnetenhaus of Berlin
- Incumbent
- Assumed office 27 October 2016

Personal details
- Born: 6 July 1986 (age 39) Rostock, East Germany
- Party: The Left (since 2016); Pirate Party (2009–2014)
- Spouse: Oliver Höfinghoff (m. 2018)
- Occupation: Voice actress; politician; activist

Anne Helm (born 6 July 1986) is a German politician and voice actress. She is serving as parliamentary leader of The Left in the Abgeordnetenhaus of Berlin since June 2020, and has been a member of the Abgeordnetenhaus since 2016. She was previously a member of the Pirate Party Germany from 2009 to 2014.

She began her voice acting career at the age of nine, and is best known for voicing Babe in the German dub of Babe. She is also known for voicing Mallory Grace in The Spiderwick Chronicles.

== Early life and voice acting career ==
Helm was born in Rostock as the daughter of the actor and voice actor Gunnar Helm, and grew up in Neukölln. She attended Albert-Einstein-Gymnasium and earned her Abitur in 2006.

Like her father, Helm has been a voice actress since the age of nine. She is the German voice of Anna Kendrick, Margot Robbie, Ludivine Sagnier, Michelle Dockery and Jennette McCurdy. Her sister Luise, who is also a voice actress, is the German voice of Megan Fox and Scarlett Johansson.

== Political career ==
=== Pirate Party ===
Helm joined the Pirate Party in 2009. She was elected to the municipal council of Neukölln in 2011, and stood in the Berlin-Neukölln constituency in the 2013 German federal election, winning 4.4% of votes. The same year, she became spokeswoman for asylum policy for the Pirate Party. She also ran in the 2014 European Parliament election in fifth place on the party list, but was not elected.

During the commemoration of the bombing of Dresden in February 2014, Helm attended a protest in which she appeared topless with the words "Thanks Bomber Harris" painted on her body. She initially denied involvement since she was wearing a mask in the publicised photographs, but later admitted that it was her. Her actions, particularly the phrase "thanks Bomber Harris", attracted significant criticism as well as threats of violence against her.

In September 2014, it was reported that Helm had terminated her membership of the Pirate Party. She remained a member of the Neukölln municipal council.

=== The Left ===
In January 2016, Helm was among 36 sitting or former Pirate Party members who signed a declaration stating that they would instead give "critical and solidary" support to The Left. In an interview with Neues Deutschland, Helm explained that her decision had been made in common with other dissident Pirates, and that she wanted to bring a clear left-wing perspective to her politics. The same month, she became of a member of the steering committee of the Emancipatory Left, a libertarian socialist faction within The Left.

In March 2016, Helm announced that she would run for The Left in the 2016 Berlin state election. She was elected to the Abgeordnetenhaus on the state party list, and became spokeswoman for media and strategies against the right.

In 2017, Helm was found among a list of "terror suspects" drafted by the planners of the Day X plot, which investigators interpreted as a designation for potential targets to be attacked. In 2020, she was also subject to death threats from the self-proclaimed "NSU 2.0".

After Carola Bluhm and Udo Wolf resigned as co-leaders of the Left parliamentary group, Helm and Carsten Schatz were elected as their successors on 2 June 2020. Helm was fifth on the state party list in the 2021 Berlin state election and was re-elected; she also ran in the constituency of Mitte 3, and placed fourth with 12.7% of votes.

== Acting roles ==
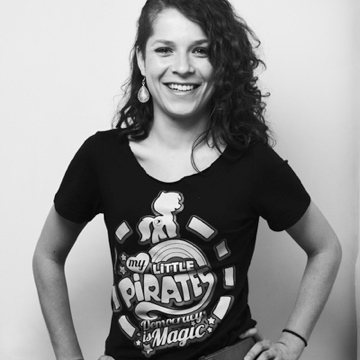
Helm in 2012

=== Television animation ===
- Avatar: The Last Airbender (Ty Lee (Olivia Hack))
- My Little Pony: Friendship Is Magic (Silver Spoon (Shannon Chan-Kent) and Diamond Tiara (Chantal Strand) after Jill Schulz)
- Mobile Suit Gundam SEED (Lacus Clyne (Rie Tanaka))

=== Theatrical animation ===
- The Girl Who Leapt Through Time (Makoto Konno (Riisa Naka))

=== Dubbing roles (live-action) ===
- Babe (Babe the Gallant Pig (Christine Cavanaugh))
- Babe: Pig in the City (Babe the Gallant Pig (Elizabeth Daily))
- Before and After (T.J. (Oliver Graney))
- Dead Like Me (Georgia "George" Lass (Ellen Muth))
- The Grudge 2 (Lacey Kimble (Sarah Roemer))
- Into the Wild (Carine McCandless (Jena Malone))
- King of California (Miranda (Evan Rachel Wood))
- Ned's Declassified School Survival Guide (Missy Meany (Carlie Casey))
- One Tree Hill (TV series) (Brooke Davis (Sophia Bush))
- The Quiet (Dot (Camilla Belle))
- The Ring (Samara Morgan (Daveigh Chase))
- The Ring Two (Samara Morgan (Daveigh Chase))
- Shark (Julie Stark (Danielle Panabaker))
- The Spiderwick Chronicles (Mallory Grace (Sarah Bolger))
- Volver (Paula (Yohana Cobo))
- iCarly (Sam Puckett (Jennette McCurdy))
- Sam & Cat (Sam Puckett (Jennette McCurdy))

=== Video games ===
- Kingdom Hearts II (Naminé (Brittany Snow))
- Kingdom Hearts: Chain of Memories (Naminé (Meaghan Jette Martin))
