= Niklas Graßelt =

German politician (born 1993)

Niklas Graßelt (born 1993 in Berlin) is a German politician from the Christian Democratic Union (CDU). He has been a member of the Berlin House of Representatives since 2023.

== Life ==
Graßelt graduated from high school at the Andreas-Gymnasium in Berlin-Friedrichshain in 2012. He then studied political science and economics at the University of Greifswald. He completed his studies in 2017 with a Bachelor of Arts. From 2016 to 2021 he worked for Michael Dietmann, member of the Berlin House of Representatives. From 2021 to 2023 he worked at the Senate Department for Interior Affairs, Digitalization and Sport.

Graßelt lives in Berlin-Reinickendorf.

== Political career ==
Graßelt is a member of the CDU. From 2021 to 2023 he was a member of the Reinickendorf district council.

Graßelt ran in the election for the Berlin House of Representatives in 2021 and the repeat election in 2023 in seventh place on his party's Reinickendorf district list. After he missed entry into the Berlin state parliament in the 2021 election, he entered the House of Representatives in 2023 via the district list because Emine Demirbüken-Wegner had decided not to accept her mandate.

== See also ==
- List of members of the 19th Abgeordnetenhaus of Berlin (2023–2026)
