= Ronneburg =

Ronneburg may refer to:

- Ronneburg, Hesse, a town in Germany
- Ronneburg, Thuringia, a town in Germany
- Rauna Castle, a former residence of the Archbishop of Riga in modern Latvia
- Rönneburg, Hamburg, Germany
- Kristian Ronneburg, German politician
