= Schatz =

The term Schatz can refer to:

- An ornamental or occupational German surname meaning "treasure" or "treasury" (as a town treasurer)
  - A term of endearment in German-speaking countries, comparable to "honey" or "darling" in English
- The futures contract listed on Eurex with this two-year debt as the underlying.

The term Shatz (pronounced the same way as Schatz) can refer to:

- The Yiddish name of a city Suceava in Europe

== Surnames ==
People with the surname Schatz or variants include:

- Aaron Schatz, American football analyst
- Albert Schatz (disambiguation)
- Avner Shats, Israeli author
- Boris Schatz, founder of Bezalel Academy
- Brian Schatz, American politician from Hawaii
- Carla J. Shatz, American neurobiologist
- Carsten Schatz (born 1970), German politician
- Donny Schatz, sprint car driver
- George C. Schatz, American theoretical chemist
- Gottfried Schatz, Swiss-Austrian biochemist
- Henry L. Schatz, German American agriculture attaché, involved in Canadian Caper
- Herman Schatz, American blacksmith and politician
- Howard Schatz, American photographer
- Ilene Kristen (born Ilene Schatz), American actress
- Jerry Tucker (actor) (born Jerome H. Schatz), American actor
- Leslie Shatz, American sound engineer
- Louise Schatz (1916–1997), Canadian-born Israeli artist and designer
- Lydia Schatz, Liberian-American girl, killed by her own parents
- Mark Schatz, musician
- Mike Schatz, American creative director, copywriter, and voice actor
- Mikhail Shats
- Paul Schatz (1898–1979), sculptor, inventor and mathematician
- Roman Schatz, German-born Finnish television presenter and writer
- Ruta Šaca-Marjaša (Ruta Maksovna Shats-Mariash)
- Shaul Shats, Israeli painter
- Warren Schatz, American producer, arranger and conductor
- Zahara Schatz, Israeli artist

== See also ==
- Schatz-Walzer (Treasure Waltz)
