= Sebastian Czaja =

German politician (born 1983)

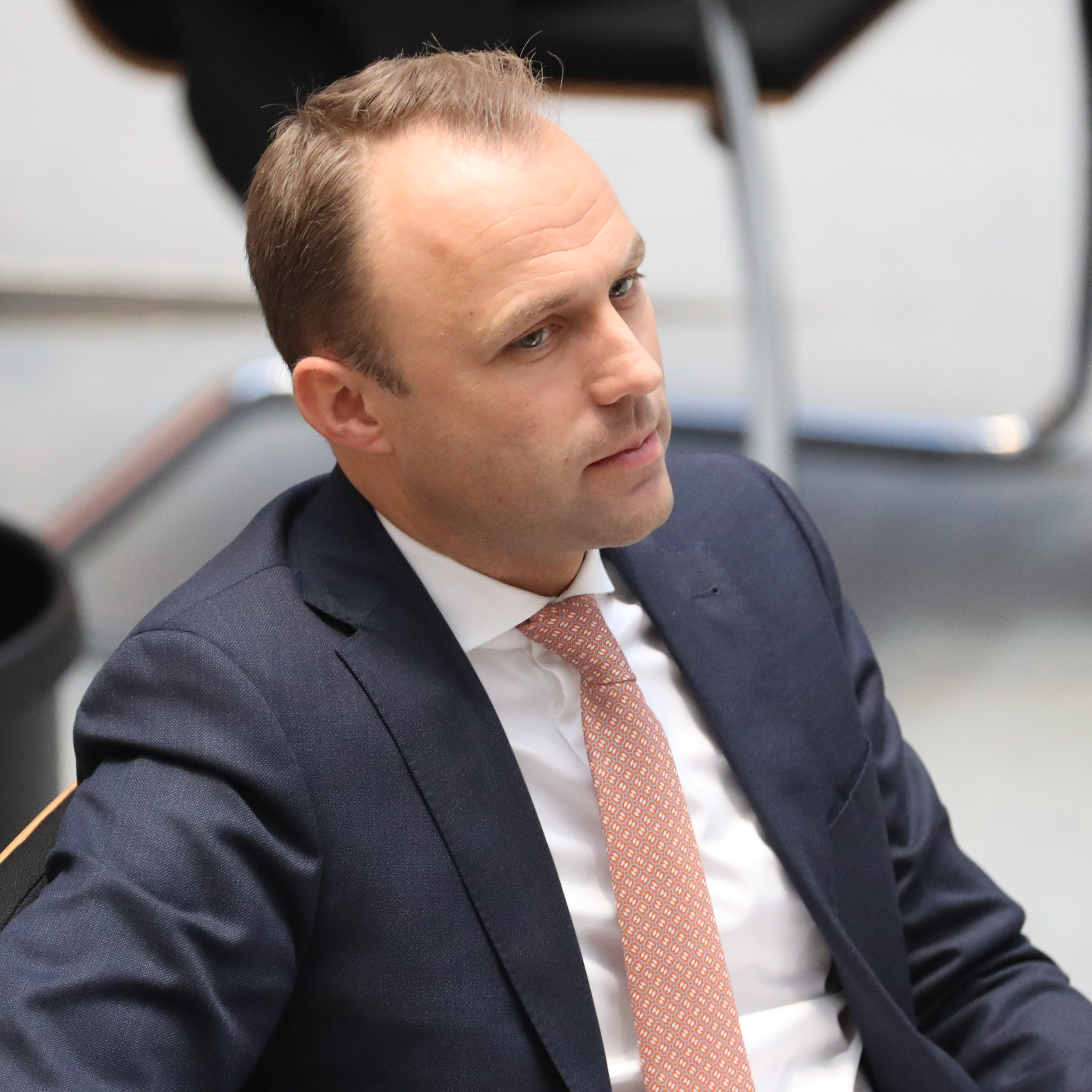
- Czaja in 2021

Leader of the Free Democratic Party in the Abgeordnetenhaus of Berlin
- In office 27 October 2016 – 2023
- Preceded by: Christoph Meyer (2011)
- Succeeded by: party not represented in parliament

Member of the Abgeordnetenhaus of Berlin
- In office 27 October 2016 – 2023
- In office 17 September 2006 – 27 October 2011

Personal details
- Born: Sebastian Czaja; 28 June 1983 (age 43) East Berlin, East Germany
- Party: FDP

Sebastian Czaja (born 28 June 1983) is a German politician of the Free Democratic Party (FDP). He served as parliamentary leader of the FDP in the Abgeordnetenhaus of Berlin from 2016 to 2023, and was lead candidate for the party in the 2016, 2021 and 2023 state elections.

== Life and education ==
Czaja was born in East Berlin and grew up in Mahlsdorf. His mother is a nurse and his father an electrician. He graduated from Klingenberg high school in Biesdorf in 2000, and attended the Oberstufenzentrum Energietechnik II from 2000 to 2004, where he obtained a subject-specific university entrance qualification. In January 2004 he completed his apprenticeship in electrical engineering by passing the journeyman's examination. After attending the Victor Klemperer College in Marzahn from 2004 to 2008, he obtained his Abitur. He then worked for the construction company Strempel & Große, which helped finance his district office in Marzahn-Hellersdorf.

After leaving the Abgeordnetenhaus in 2011, Czaja was an advisor for the firm Jahn Baumanagement from 2012 to 2013. He then joined beton & rohrbau C.F. Thymian and was responsible for project development there, as well as at beton & rohrbau 2.0 GmbH since 2016.

== Political career ==
=== Christian Democratic Union ===
Czaja was a member of the Christian Democratic Union (CDU) from 1999 to 2005. From 2001 to 2002, he was district chairman of the Young Union in Marzahn-Hellersdorf and deputy chairman of the CDU's student wing in Berlin. He was elected to the municipal council of Marzahn-Hellersdorf for the CDU in 2001.

=== Free Democratic Party ===
Czaja joined the Free Democratic Party in 2005. His decision to change parties was motivated by a dispute over public subsidies to the Arche soup kitchen in Hellersdorf. Czaja believed that, due to the high volume of donations received by the kitchen, subsidies should be reduced. The CDU's opposition to his proposal prompted him to defect to the FDP and vote to cut subsidies. He also claimed that the CDU had neglected education, family, and social affairs policy. His defection saw the FDP group in the Marzahn-Hellersdorf council achieve official faction status, and Czaja became its chairman. His actions caused considerable controversy, and he was voted the second most-unpopular person in Berlin in 2005, behind Hartmut Mehdorn, the CEO of Deutsche Bahn.

He was elected to the Abgeordnetenhaus of Berlin in the 2006 Berlin state election and became FDP spokesman for sport, vocational training, science, and research, and was a member of the committee for the same. He was also a member of the state expert committee for education and sport and the federal expert committee for higher education. He became deputy leader of the FDP parliamentary group in April 2009. The same year, he became district chairman of the Marszahn-Hellersdorf FDP, a position he held until 2012.

He sought re-election to the Abgeordnetenhaus in the 2011 Berlin state election, running at the top of the FDP's in Marzahn-Hellersdorf party list. He was not re-elected as the FDP fell to just 1.8% of votes and lost all its seats. On the night of the election, he criticised then-leader and lead candidate Christoph Meyer and called for his resignation. Czaja was subsequently voted out of his position as deputy parliamentary leader.

From September 2015 to February 2020, Czaja was general-secretary of the FDP Berlin. At the party congress on 12 March 2016, he was nominated as lead candidate for the 2016 Berlin state election with 72.4% approval. The FDP won 6.7% of votes in the election and re-entered the Abgeordnetenhaus with 12 seats. Czaja was subsequently elected leader of the FDP parliamentary group.

In February 2019, he became chairman of the FDP's Steglitz-Zehlendorf branch, and in November 2020, he was elected one of three deputy leaders of the Berlin FDP.

Czaja was again elected as lead candidate for the 2021 Berlin state election with 93.8% approval. The FDP achieved a marginal improvement but did not improve their seat count, and remained in opposition after the election. After the municipal elections in Steglitz-Zehlendorf, where Czaja is district chairman, the FDP joined a traffic light coalition and displaced the CDU as governing party for the first time in fifty years. Following irregularities during the election, the 2021 election was annulled by the state constitutional court and repeated on 12 February 2023, where the FDP fell under the 5% threshold and subsequently lost all seats, including Czaja's.

== Controversy ==
In November 2017, it was reported that Czaja and his FDP colleague Thomas Seerig had been receiving a publicly-funded €1,000 monthly allowance for an office that had not yet been constructed. Czaja stated that his original statement on the issue had been unclear, and that the allowance had not yet been paid.

In April 2019, Czaja described Engelbert Lütke Daldrup, manager of the Berlin Brandenburg Airport and former Berlin state secretary, as "a notorious liar from whom taxpayers cannot expect any truth". Lütke Daldrup subsequently filed a legal complaint against Czaja for defamation, which ended with a settlement in which Czaja agreed not to refer to Daldrup in such a manner in the future.

In February 2020, Czaja wrote an article for the Berliner Zeitung in which he wrote that Björn Höcke, Thuringian branch leader of the Alternative for Germany, was "the kind of politician whom a court classifies as a fascist on the basis of verifiable fact". In March, the Hamburg Regional Court issued an interim injunction prohibiting him from repeating the claim, stating that Czaja's wording could be construed by readers to mean that a court had definitively declared Höcke a fascist. The court in question had ruled that the description of Höcke as a fascist "lies on verifiable fact".

== Political positions ==
Czaja was the initiator of the referendum "Berlin needs Tegel", the objective of which was to keep Berlin Tegel Airport operational even after the opening of the new Berlin Brandenburg Airport. The referendum on 24 September 2017 saw 56.4% vote in favour of the proposal. This corresponded to 40.1% of eligible voters, surpassing the quorum of 25% required for the result to be considered valid. However, as the referendum did not include specific provisions for the proposal, it was non-binding. After months of debate, in June 2018, the Abgeordnetenhaus passed a resolution declaring that the referendum could not be implemented by the state government.

== Other engagements ==
In 2014, Czaja co-founded the FDP-affiliated association Liberale Immobiliedenrunde ("Liberal Real Estate Circle") together with former FDP housing spokesman Sebastian Körber and Jürgen Michael Schick, chairman of the Real Estate Association of Germany. Czaja became its deputy chairman. He is involved in the German Parliamentary Society and was a member of the German Council Ne(X)t Gen which promotes young talent. In addition, he is an ambassador for the Sport against Violence association, which aims to provide alternatives and perspectives for young people in difficult urban environments. Among other things, he is also vice-chairman of the sponsoring association of the Victor Klemperer College, a member of the board of the Berliner Business Dialogue, a member of the Association of Friends and Sponsors - Kiddies Family, and a member of the Advisory Board for the Reconstruction of the Fraenkelufer Synagogue.

== Awards and honours ==
After the successful FDP campaign in the 2016 Berlin state election, the party and executive agency HEIMAT received the 2016 Politikaward from the trade journal Politics & Communication in the Political Campaign, Digital Public Affairs, and Viral Communication categories. The latter was specifically awarded for their guerrilla campaign to encourage startups to invest in Berlin, in which the party had campaigned in London with the slogan "Dear start-ups, keep calm and move to Berlin."

In 2016, the business magazine Capital included Czaja in their "Rising Stars" list in the category "Politics and Communication". In 2017 and 2018, he was included in their "Young Elite - Top 40 under 40" list in the category "Politics and the State".

== Personal life ==
Czaja has Polish heritage.

Czaja is married and has a daughter. He was introduced to politics by his older brother Mario Czaja, who is a CDU politician.
