= Shats =

Shats may refer to:

- Avner Shats, Israeli author
- Mikhail Shats, Russian actor and activist
- Shaul Shats, Israeli artist

== See also ==
- Shat (disambiguation)
- Schatz
