= Shat =

Shat may refer to:

- Al-Shat
- Al-Shat S.C., a Libyan football club
- Shat River, a river in Russia; see Novomoskovsk, Russia
- -shat (suffix), a suffix found in Armenian toponymy
- Shat, an ancient Egyptian currency; see Central bank § History
- Defence Historical Service, the French military archives formerly known as the French: Service Historique de l’Armée de Terre
- Šėta, a town in Lithuania
- Skelmanthorpe, a town in Northern England
- Past tense of shit, an English-language vulgarity

== See also ==
- Shats (disambiguation)
