= Katalin Gennburg =

German politician (born 1984)

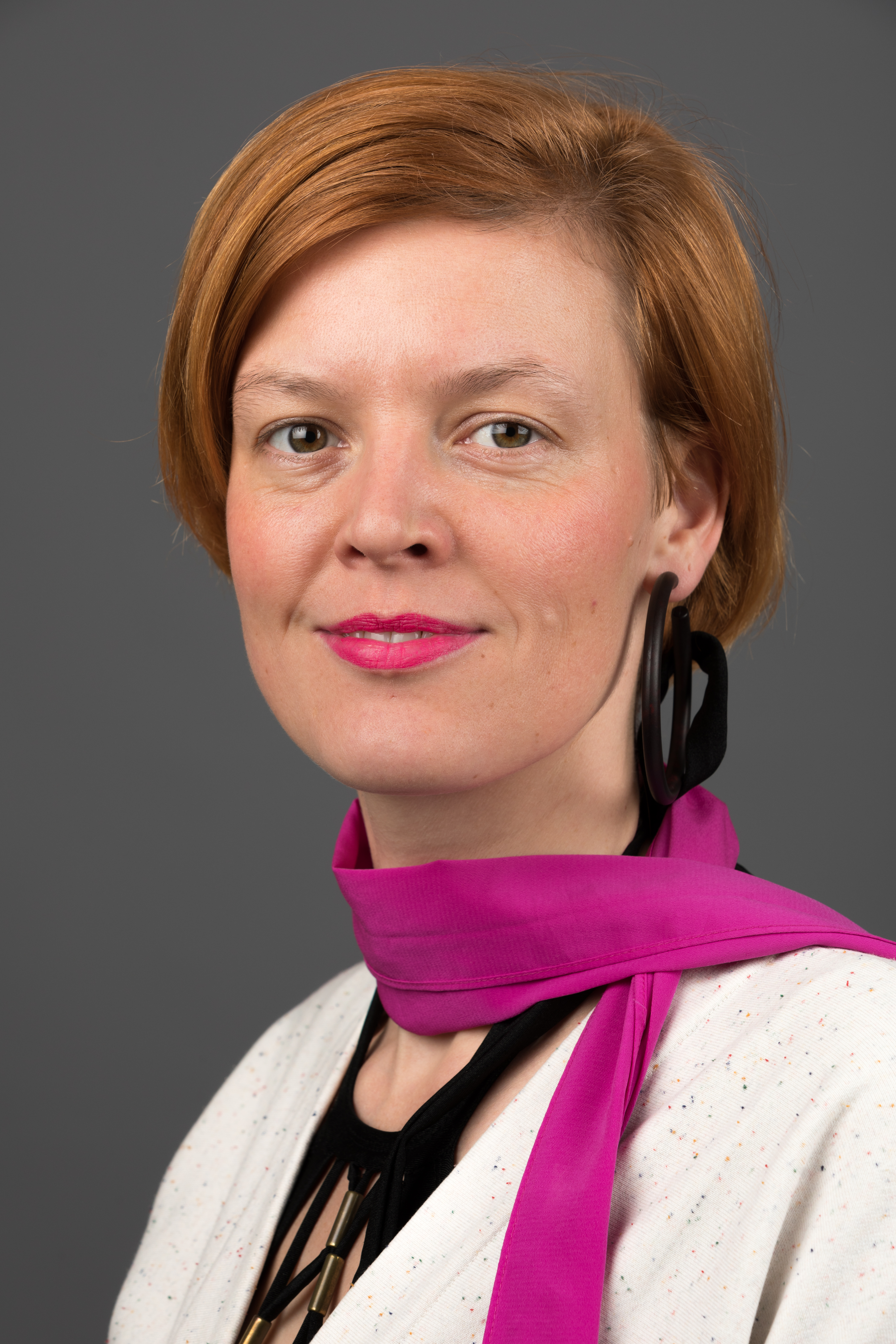
- Gennburg in 2017

Member of the Bundestag for Berlin
- Incumbent
- Assumed office 23 March 2025

Member of the Abgeordnetenhaus of Berlin
- In office 18 September 2016 – 23 March 2025

Personal details
- Born: Katalin Gennburg; 5 March 1984 (age 42) Weißenfels, East Germany
- Party: The Left
- Education: Technische Universität Berlin

Katalin Gennburg (born 5 March 1984) is a German politician of The Left who has been a member of the Bundestag since 2025. She previously served in the Abgeordnetenhaus, the state parliament of Berlin, from 2016 until 2025.

== Education and life ==
Gennburg attended the Lise-Meitner-Gymnasium in Falkensee and earned her Abitur in 2004. She then studied at Technische Universität Berlin, graduating with a bachelor's degree in culture and technology in 2010, and later a master's degree in historical urbanism in 2014 with her thesis The materiality of the commuter belt: On the privatization of land in East Germany since 1990 – the Berlin suburb of Falkensee and the construction of the Herlitz works. She has a daughter and lives in Alt-Treptow.

From 2005 to 2007, Gennburg was a student assistant to member of the Bundestag Jan Korte. During 2007 she did freelance work and public relations work for the European Left in the European Parliament. She then worked as a women's representative in the humanities faculty at the TU Berlin until 2010, before becoming a tutor at the Department of Urban and Regional Sociology. From 2014 to 2016, she was a research assistant for Berlin Senator for Urban Development Katrin Lompscher.

== Politics ==
Gennburg joined the Party of Democratic Socialism (PDS) in 2002. In 2003, she was elected to the city council of Falkensee, serving until 2005. She was the youngest member of the council and was responsible for developing an urban development plan for the area, which later spurred her to study historical urbanism. From 2007 to 2008, she was co-spokeswoman for The Left's youth branch, Left Youth Solid, along with others including Lena Kreck.

She was elected to the Abgeordnetenhaus of Berlin in the 2016 Berlin state election, winning the direct constituency of Treptow-Köpenick 1 with 26.4% of votes. She became The Left's spokeswoman for urban development. She was re-elected in the 2021 Berlin state election, again winning her constituency with 26.2% of votes.

After the 2021 election, Gennburg campaigned for Left members to vote "no" to the proposed coalition agreement with the SPD and Greens. She cited concerns about housing and development policy, particularly the shift of the urban development portfolio from The Left to the SPD. She suggested that the SPD and Greens could not be trusted to protect tenants' interests, and would take a pro-business approach to housing construction and the result of the Deutsche Wohnen & Co. enteignen referendum. She also criticised her party for being insufficiently assertive in the previous coalition and ceding too much ground to the more moderate parties. The coalition agreement was ultimately passed with 75% approval.

In the 2023 Berlin repeat state election, Gennburg was re-elected in her constituency. She became a member of the committees on urban development and environment and climate.

Gennburg was nominated as The Left's candidate for Berlin-Marzahn – Hellersdorf in the 2025 German federal election, succeeding former member Petra Pau who chose to retire. Gennburg was also elected to third place on the party's state list. She won 16.8% of constituency votes, placing third, and was elected on the party list. She resigned from the Abgeordnetenhaus to take up her seat in the Bundestag in March 2025.
