= Melanie Kühnemann-Grunow =

German politician (born 1972)

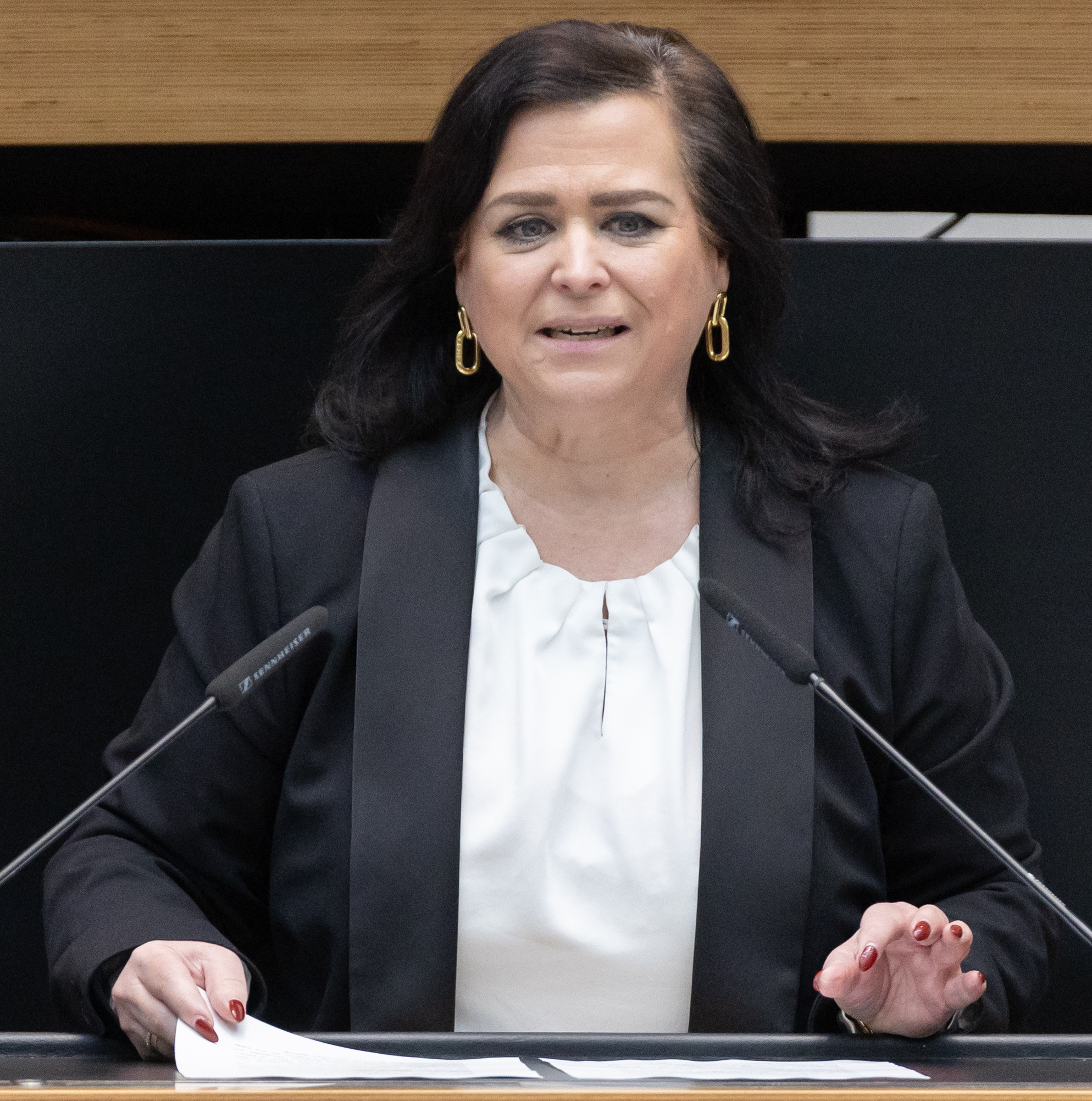
- Kühnemann-Grunow in 2025

Member of the Abgeordnetenhaus of Berlin
- Incumbent
- Assumed office 27 October 2016
- Constituency: Tempelhof-Schöneberg

Personal details
- Born: 16 August 1972 (age 53) Berlin
- Party: Social Democratic Party (since 1988)

Melanie Kühnemann-Grunow (born 16 August 1972 in Berlin) is a German politician serving as a member of the Abgeordnetenhaus of Berlin since 2016. She has served as chairwoman of the Social Democratic Party in Tempelhof-Schöneberg since 2020.
