= Jessica Bießmann =

German politician

Jessica Bießmann was a German politician (AfD) as member of the Abgeordnetenhaus of Berlin from 2016 to 2021.

Bießmann is an automobile saleswoman and, according to her own information, worked for a security company. In 2016 she was elected to Abgeordnetenhaus. In 2018 she was suspended from the party after pictures emerged of her posing in front of wine bottles depicting Adolf Hitler, however the following year party officials limited measures against her to a warning. Bießmann was heavily criticized by AfD politicians and others because she hardly appeared at all in parliamentary work after 2019.
