= Dirk Stettner =

German politician

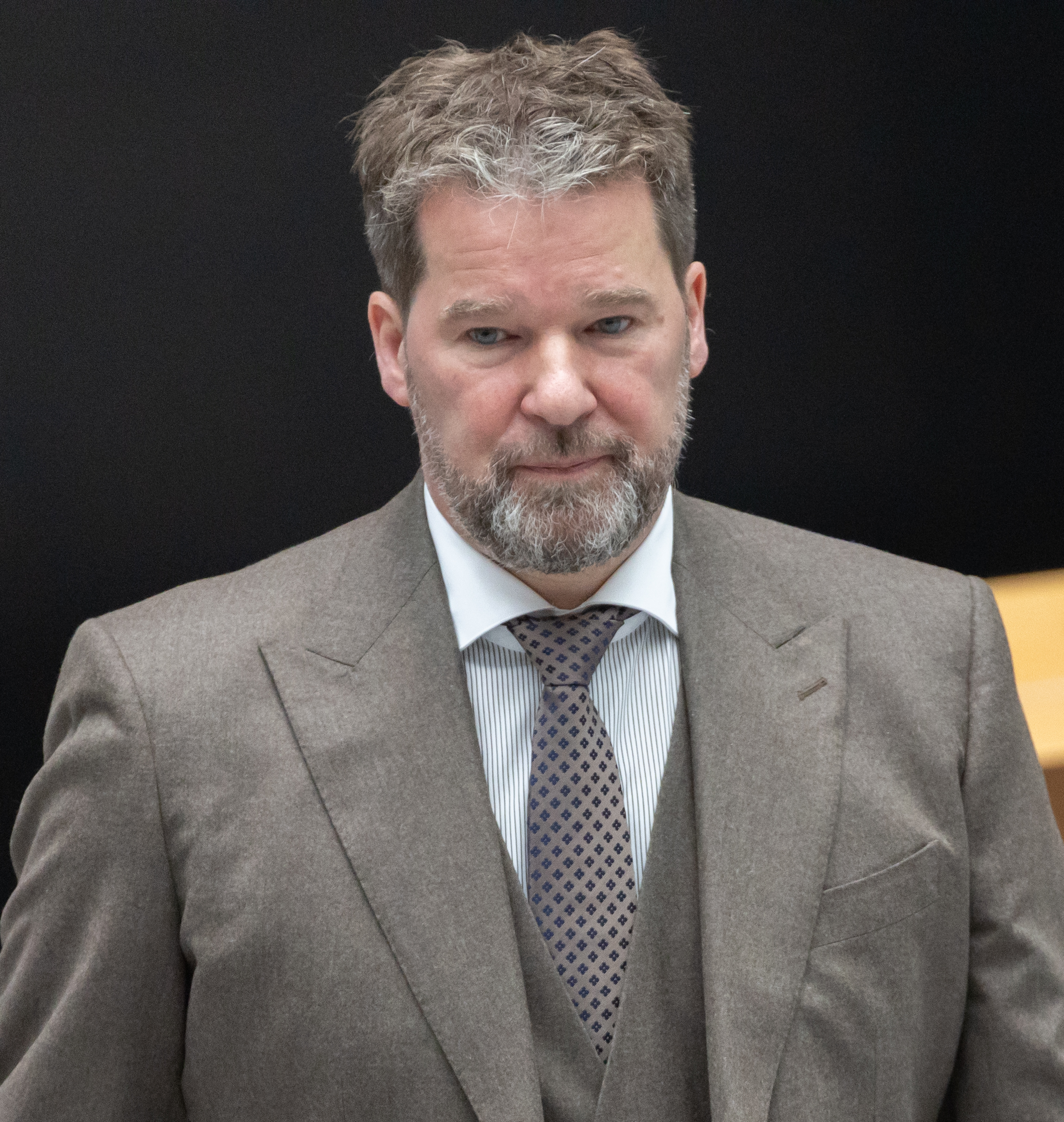
- Stettner in 2013

Member of the Berlin Parliament for Pankow
- Incumbent
- Assumed office 27 October 2011

Personal details
- Born: 24 August 1969 (age 57) Mönchengladbach
- Party: CDU
- Education: University of Bonn; Free University of Berlin
- Website: www.dirk-stettner.de

Dirk Stettner (born 24 August 1969) is a German entrepreneur and politician. He is a member of (CDU).

== Life ==
Stettner completed high school in Siegen. He then spent a year in the press and information office of the city and then completed his military service in Wetzlar. He then spent three years as a staff member in the German parliament Bundestag and began a part-time study of history, law and politics at the University of Bonn. In 1994 he moved to Berlin, where he took up a part-time study of political science at the Free University of Berlin. Stettner is married and has three children.

=== Careers ===
Stettner is a partner and managing director of the "Stettner + Stettner GmbH" for real estate development, planning and design. He is also a member of the supervisory board for the real estate services company "GW-C Grundwert Consult AG". Furthermore, Stettner founded a non-profit sheltered workshop in 2004/05 under the name "Wisowerk gGmbH" as well as a non-profit corporation, "Wisowerk gAG", the purpose of which was the integration of people with disabilities into the labor market. Prior, Stettner help various managing positions. He was member of the board of First Tuesday Germany, for example.

=== Political career ===
In addition to his professional activities, Stettner began to become politically active. He became a member of the CDU and was elected district chairmen of the CDU Pankow in 2005. In 2006, allegations were made that in his capacity as an entrepreneur he had inflated invoices and cheated a contractor of a larger amount of money within the context of the insolvency of one of his companies. Stettner dismissed the accusations, but still stepped down from his position as district chairman. In 2011 he stood as a candidate in the Berlin state election and was elected on the Pankow district list. From October 2011 to January 2012 he was a member of the CDU parliamentary group.

On 28 January 2012, Stettner stepped down from the parliamentary group after the Berlin public prosecutor's office filed charges against him for suspicion of fraud, insolvency protraction, and wrongful withholding of social services. The investigation included Stettner's office as director of Wisowerk in the years 2005 and 2006. In May 2012, the case was heard by the Tiergarten District Court. Stettner was found guilty of subsidy fraud, insolvency protraction, and the withholding of social security contributions and sentenced to one year probation. Stettner appealed the judgment. The appeal proceedings before the Berlin Regional Court were concluded in mid-2015 and Stettner was ordered to pay €36,000, after which he resumed activity in the CDU parliamentary group on 23 June 2015.

Throughout the proceedings, Stettner remained a non-attached member of the Berlin House of Representatives. He is now a member of the Committee on Digital Management, Data Protection and Freedom of Information, as well as in the Subcommittee on Investment Management and Controlling. In January 2015 Stettner was re-elected as chairman of the CDU Weissensee.

=== Volunteer positions ===
Stettner is chairman of the "Verein für Weißensee" and the "Verein Siedlung Rennbahn Berlin-Weißensee," which are both charitable organizations.
