= Wiebke Neumann =

German politician (born 1986)

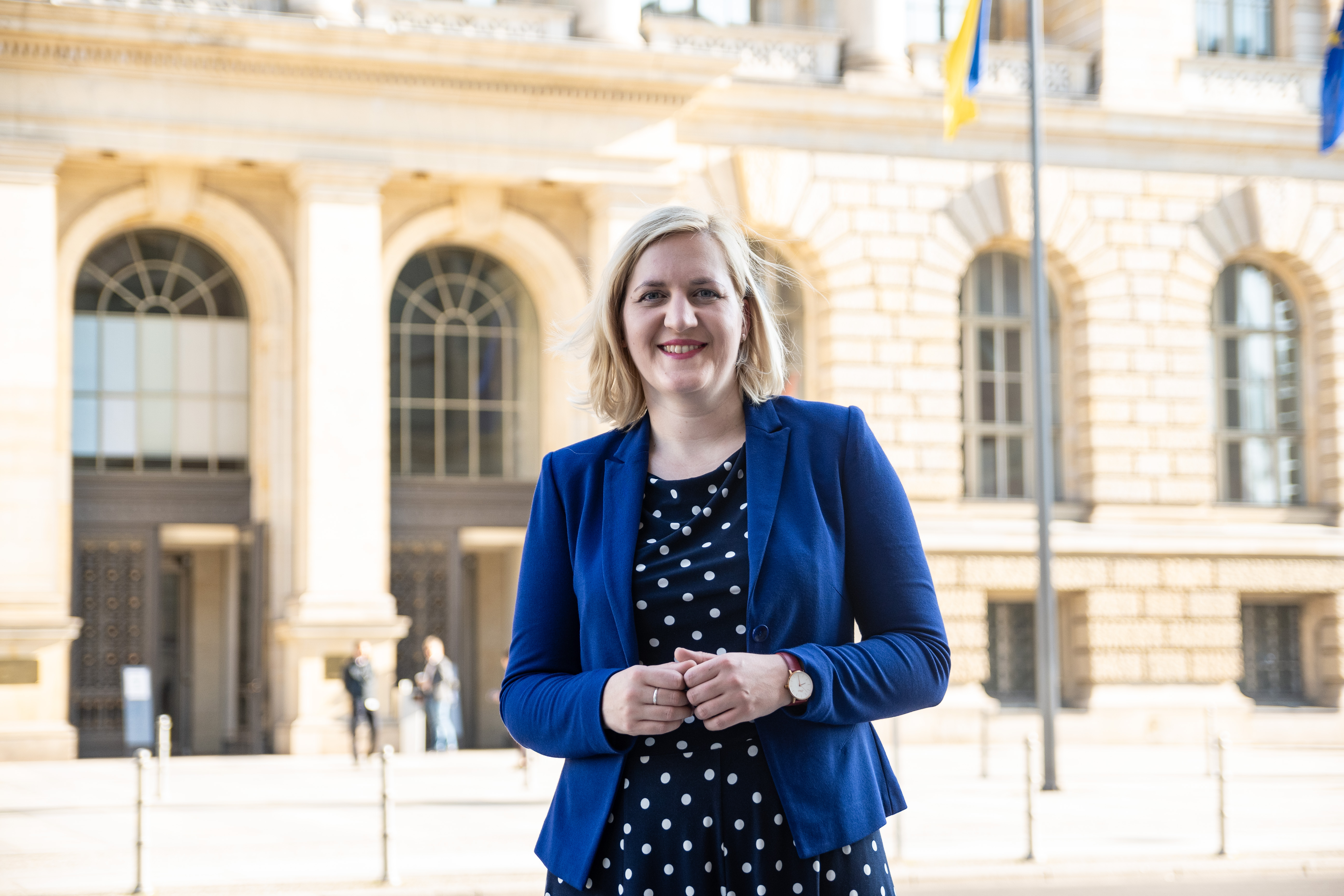
- Neumann in 2024

Member of the Abgeordnetenhaus of Berlin
- Incumbent
- Assumed office 4 May 2023
- Preceded by: Michael Biel
- Constituency: Tempelhof-Schöneberg

Personal details
- Born: 1986 (age 39–40) Quedlinburg
- Party: Social Democratic Party

Wiebke Neumann (born 1986 in Quedlinburg) is a German politician serving as a member of the Abgeordnetenhaus of Berlin since 2023. She has served as co-chair of the Social Democratic Party in Tempelhof-Schöneberg since 2022.
