= Wolfgang Albers (politician) =

German politician

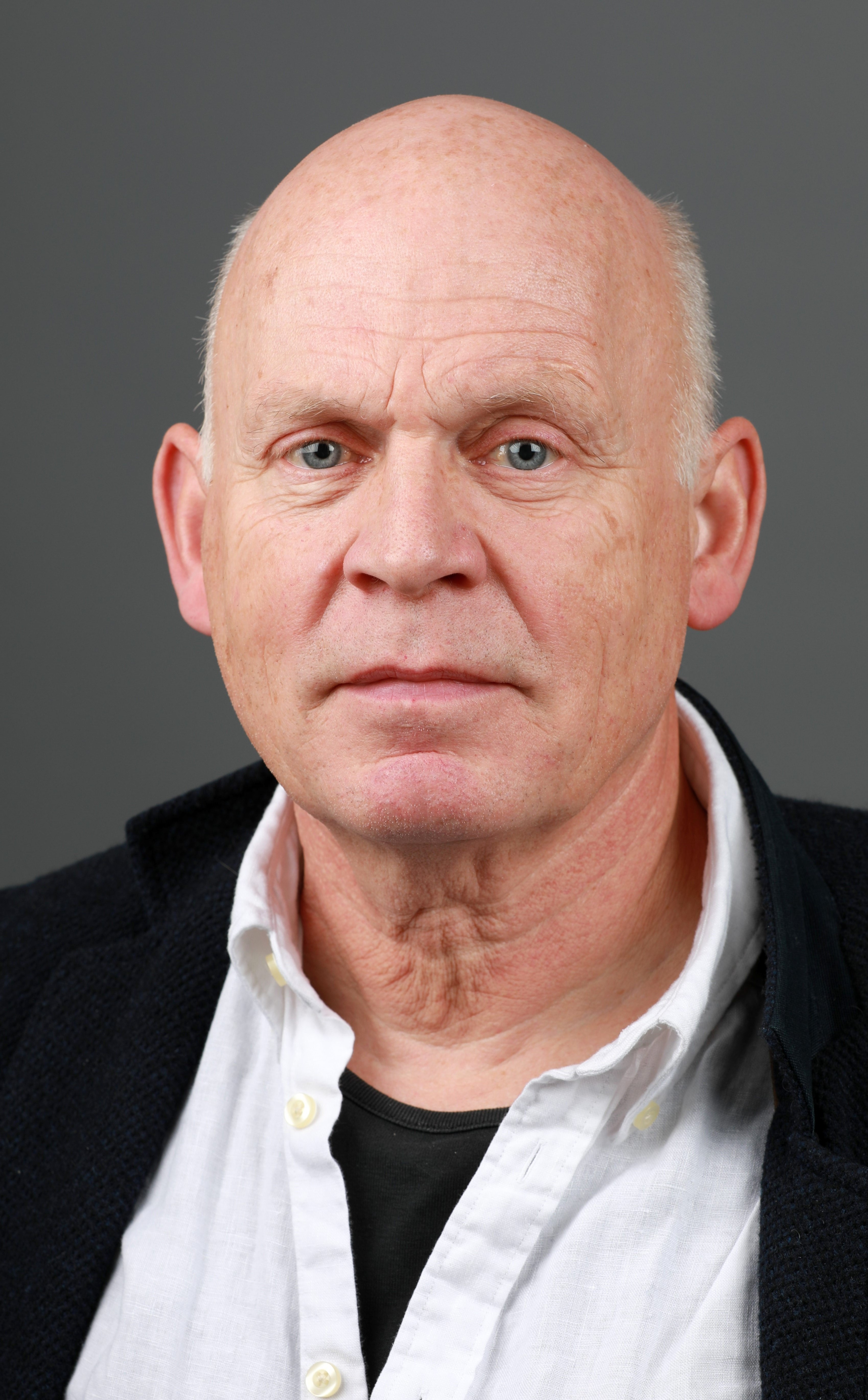
Wolfgang Albers (2017)

Wolfgang Albers (born 2 August 1950 in Essen, West Germany) is a German politician with the Left Party of Germany and a member of the Abgeordnetenhaus of Berlin.

== Biography ==
After completing his Abitur in 1970, Wolfgang Albers began studying medicine in 1974 in Marburg, eventually transferring to the University of Münster, where he completed the Staatsexamen and earned his doctorate (Promotion) in 1980.

In 1981 he began an internship in surgery at Humboldt Hospital (Humboldt-Krankenhaus) in Berlin-Reinickendorf. In the course of his internship, he also worked for half a year in cardiac surgery at the German Heart Center of Berlin (Deutsches Herzzentrum Berlin). In 1990 he became a full surgical doctor and worked as a senior physician of General and Vascular Surgery at Humboldt Hospital. Albers was elected for the first time to the worker's council of the Humboldt Hospital in 2000. After the merger of all nine previously public hospitals into the Vivantes group, he again was elected to the worker's council within the concern. From 2002 until May 2008, he sat on the Berlin Doctors' Council (Berliner Ärztekammer) as an elected delegate.

== Politics ==
In June 2005, Albers ran for office as a member of the Labour and Social Justice – The Electoral Alternative, and in May 2006, he became a member of the Party of Democratic Socialism (Linkspartei.PDS). A year later, in June 2007, the merged PDS and Linkspartei became simply the Left Party. Beginning July 2007, he has been deputy chairperson of the Left Party of Berlin. On 26 October 2006, he became a member of the 16th Abgeordetenhaus of Berlin. He is a member of the Committee for Health, Environment, and Consumer Protection, and has been its chairperson since January 2012. Additionally, he is a member of the Committee for Science and Research, for which he has been the deputy chairperson likewise since January 2012. Since 2006, he has been a member of the Group Executive Board and spokesperson for Health and Science for the party group in the Abgeordetenhaus. Following the election in September 2011, he received a direct mandate for his party in the second electoral district of Lichtenberg.
