= Albert Schatz =

Albert Schatz may refer to:

- Albert Schatz (law) (1879–1940), law professor and historian
- Albert Gerard Schatz (1921–1985), U.S. federal judge
- Albert Schatz (musician) (1839–1910), musicologist, composer, and librettist
- Albert Schatz (scientist) (1920–2005), microbiologist, co-discoverer of streptomycin
