= Al-Shat =

Al-Shat الشط
- Sub-district
- Location in Yemen
- Coordinates: 16°15′23.44″N 43°48′31.72″E
- Country: Yemen
- Governorate: 'Amran Governorate
- District: Qaflat Othor District

Population (2004)
  - Total: 2,562
- Time zone: UTC+3

'Al-Shat (Arabic: الشط) is a sub-district located in Qaflat Othor District, 'Amran Governorate, Yemen. Al-Shat had a population of 2562 according to the 2004 census.
