= Maja Lasić =

German politician

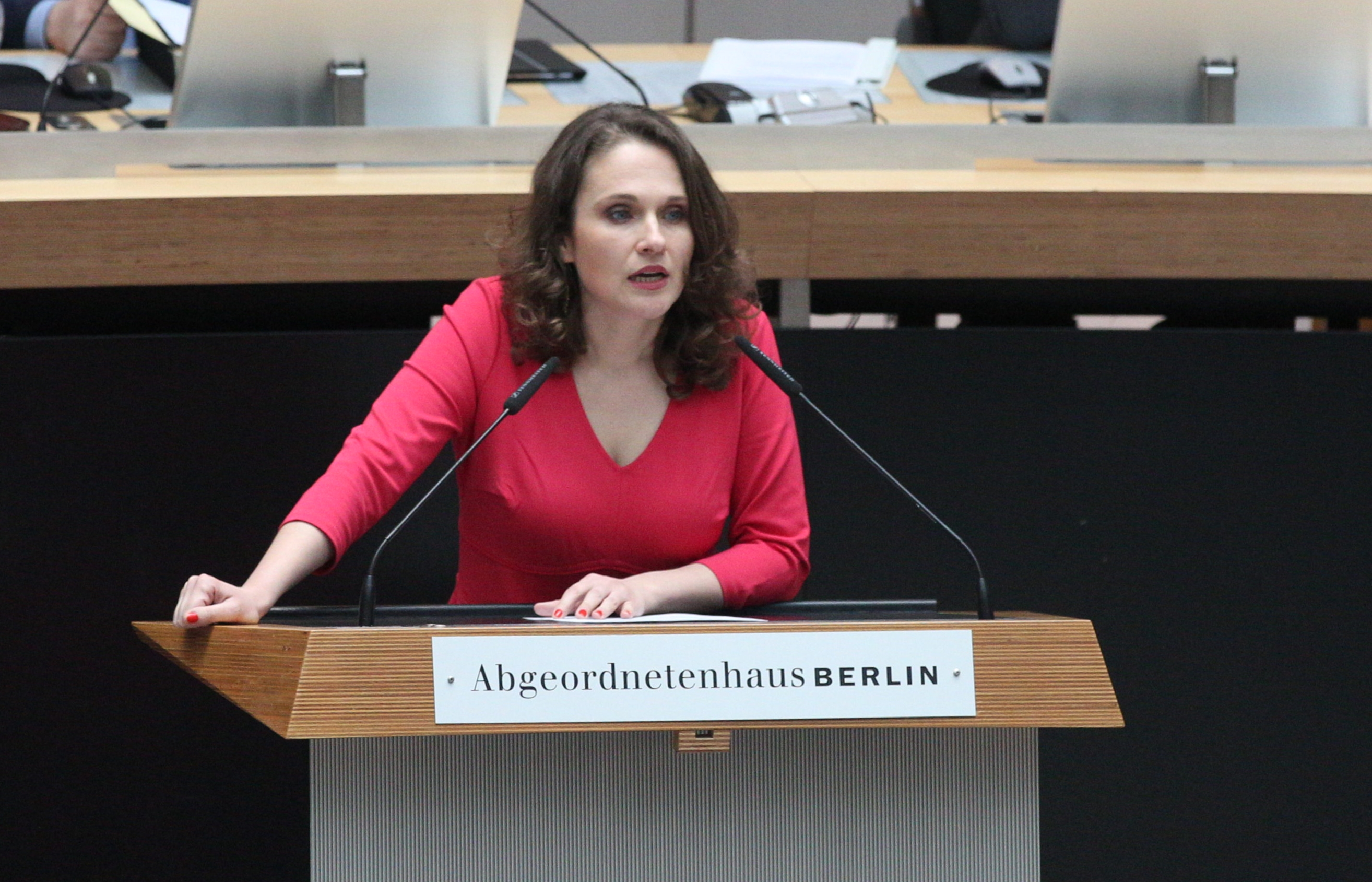

Maja Lasić (born 1979, Mostar) is a Yugoslavia-born German politician. She is an elected member of the Abgeordnetenhaus of Berlin, the parliament of the city and state of Berlin.

Lasić was born in 1979 in Mostar in former Yugoslavia, now Bosnia and Herzegovina, and moved to Germany as a refugee aged 14. After two months in a special "welcome class" she joined mainstream high school classes, and passed her Abitur in 1998. She studied biology at the University of Münster and gained a Ph.D. in biochemistry (2008) from the University of Stuttgart. She worked for Procter & Gamble from 2007 to 2009 but then moved to become first a fellow and then a manager with Teach First Deutschland. She joined the SPD in 2010 and was elected to the Abgeordnetenhaus of Berlin in 2016, representing the "Central 7" constituency which is centred on Wedding.
