= Christoph Meyer =

German politician

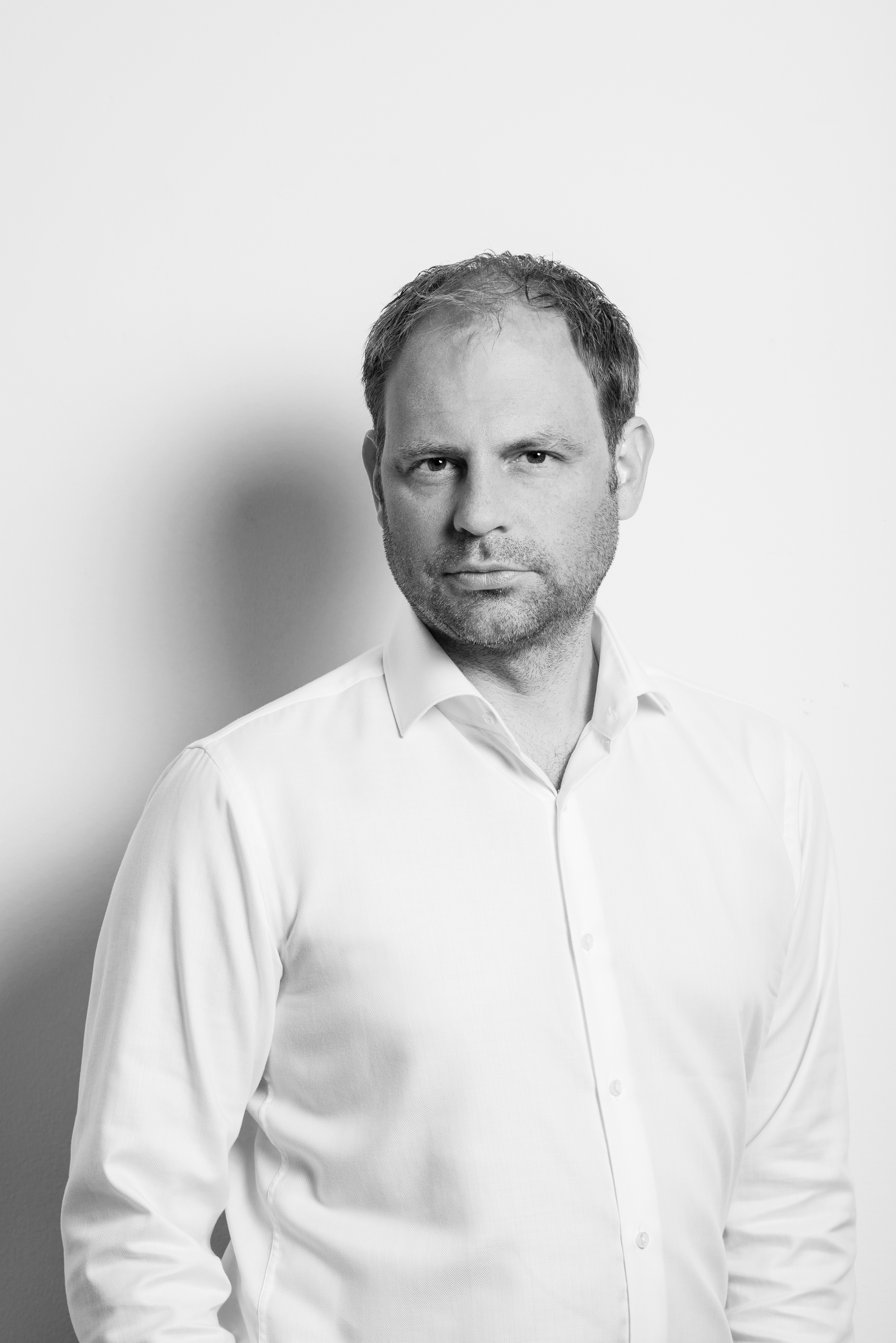
- Christoph Meyer in 2017

Member of the Bundestag
- In office 2017–2025

Personal details
- Born: 3 August 1975 (age 51) West Berlin, West Germany (now Berlin, Germany)
- Party: FDP
- Education: Viadrina European University; Free University of Berlin

Christoph Meyer (born 3 August 1975) is a German lawyer and politician of the Free Democratic Party (FDP) who served as a member of the Bundestag from the state of Berlin from 2017 to 2025.

== Early life and career ==
Meyer attended the Walther-Rathenau-Gymnasium in Berlin-Grunewald and graduated from high school in 1994. He then completed an apprenticeship as a banker at Dresdner Bank in Berlin. From 1996, he studied law at the European University Viadrina in Frankfurt (Oder) as well as at the Free University of Berlin and passed his first state examination in 2004. In 2007 he passed the Second State Examination in Law and was admitted to the bar in Berlin in 2008.

From 2012 until 2017, Meyer worked for Deutsche Rockwool.

== Political career ==
Meyer has been a member of the FDP since 1993. From 2002 to 2011, he served as a member of the State Parliament of Berlin. He chaired his party's parliamentary group from 2009 until 2011.

=== Member of the German Parliament, 2017–2025 ===
Meyer first became a member of the Bundestag in the 2017 German federal election. In parliament, he was a member of the Budget Committee. In this capacity, he served as his parliamentary group's rapporteur on the annual budget of the Federal Ministry of Family Affairs, Senior Citizens, Women and Youth and the Federal Ministry of Education and Research (2018–2020, 2022–present).

Ahead of the 2021 elections, Meyer was elected to lead the FDP's campaign in Berlin.

From 2021, Meyer served as one of six deputy chairpersons of the FDP parliamentary group under the leadership of its chairman Christian Dürr, where he oversaw the group's activities on financial policy.

== Other activities ==
- Deutsche Rockwool, Member of the Advisory Board (since 2017)
- German Industry Initiative for Energy Efficiency (DENEFF), Member of the Parliamentary Advisory Board
