= Carola Bluhm =

German politician

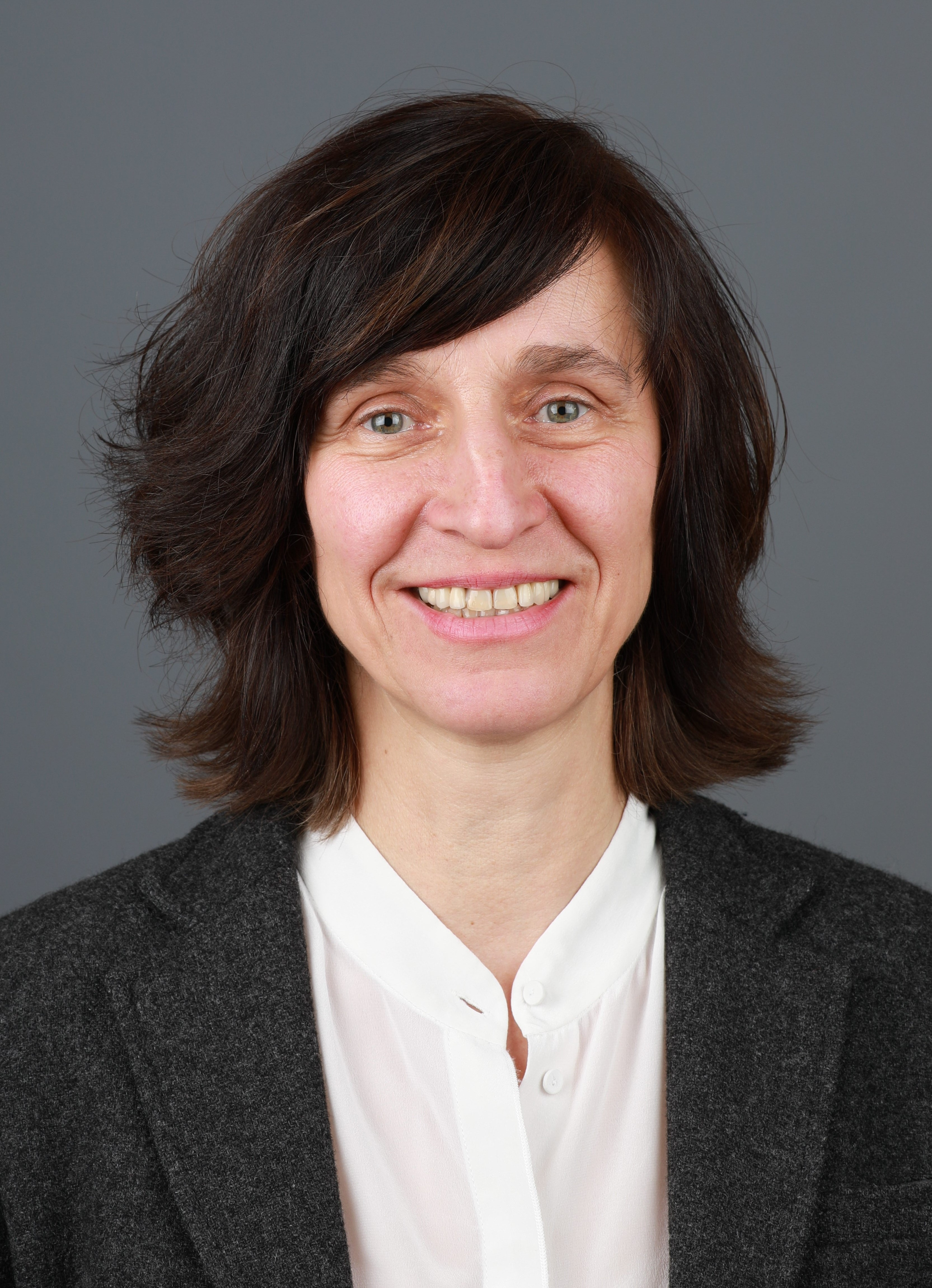
Carola Bluhm (2017)

Carola Bluhm (formerly Carola Freundl; born 16 November 1962) is a German politician (Die Linke). Since 1991 she has been a member of the Berlin House of Representatives. In 2009 she became a member of the Senate of Berlin in which, between 16 October 2009 and 2011, she served as senator for Integration, Work and Social Affairs in the Red–red coalition administration of Klaus Wowereit.

Carola Freundl was her married name. However, following the break up of her marriage she announced in 2005 that she was reverting to her maiden name.

== Life ==
Carola Bluhm was born in East Berlin. Her parents were both lawyers. Despite spending her first two and a half decades in the German Democratic Republic (East Germany), she grew up in an "open academic household" where "critical debate [on the issues of the time] took place every day". By her own account, she was encouraged to think for herself, an attitude of mind which later found its way into her political approach. She undertook a vocational education at school, passing her school leaving exams (Abitur) in 1982. This opened the way for a career in fruit and vegetable production, a valued profession in a country where, at least in the cities, fresh produce was usually in short supply. The experience was formative. After ten years at school in Berlin with the same classmates she was based in Brandenburg an der Havel, for the first time away from the capital and working with new colleagues. Ruefully she would look back on the apple harvest period when comrades started work sometimes as early as 04.00 in the morning each day, not taking time off at weekends, in order to harvest the apples with a teutonic determination to ensure that apples sorted and packed were of perfect quality, only to suffer the bitter experience of seeing their work become pointless as the fruit deteriorated in the crates because of logistical failures whereby the authorities were unable to arrange timely transportation to the shops. She joined the party in 1982 and became a candidate for local political office soon afterwards, but was never blind to the practical imperfections of the one-party East German state in action.

Passing her Abitur and her "fruit gardening education" had opened the way to a university level education: between 1982 and 1987 she attended the Humboldt University of Berlin. Her mother was fiercely opposed to her subject choice, preferring that she should obtain a degree in something less politically charged, possibly involving landscape gardening. However, Bluhm picked Sociology which, consistent with the time and place, was taught through the prism of party approved Marxism–Leninism. The teaching was nevertheless soundly structured and she emerged with a degree in 1987. Much of the focus of her studies involved the difficulties arising with the massive housing redevelopments that were a feature of East Germany in the 1980s. Older people whose children had left home were reluctant to relocate and lose all the friends and associations of the areas where they had brought up their families, while for younger people with children there was a resulting shortage of sufficiently large apartments. There was no attempt to avoid studying social issues and processes arising in the country, but any thought of discussing the interaction of such issues with the overall political structure of the country was a total taboo for academics involved in sociological or empirical social research work.

Her daughter was born in 1985. East Germany had long suffered from a desperate shortage of working age population thanks to the slaughter of war in the 1940s and industrial scale emigration from east to west during the later 1940s and through the 1950s. The government was eager to encourage more children: supported by a flexible system and by her family Bluhm was able to combine intense study with motherhood. Her son was born in 1988 after she had concluded her undergraduate studies. Between 1987 and 1991 she was employed as a research assistant at the Institute for Socialist Economic Management at the Berlin Economics Academy ("Hochschule für Ökonomie Berlin").

During the later 1980s the East German political establishment suffered a crisis of confidence as the winds of Glasnost blowing across from Moscow left old certainties looking less than certain, while intensifying industrial and commercial rivalry between the Soviet Union and the German Democratic Republic made the future look less secure, highlighting the dire fiscal position of the savagely indebted East German economy. In university sociology departments there was little appetite for undermining the state by focusing on the increasingly stark dysfunctionalities of the socialist state, but nor was it possible to overlook objective facts. Someone in Bluhm's position might have been expecting to work towards a doctorate and pursue a university career as a sociology professor, but as academic career opportunities faded away Carola Bluhm switched to politics not necessarily by design, but in response both to her personal situation, as the mother of two very young children, and to national events.

Matters came to a head after November 1989 when protesters breached the wall and it became apparent that the fraternal Soviet forces had no instructions to suppress the street protests by force, as they had in 1953 (and, more recently, in Prague in 1968). A succession of seemingly unstoppable events were set in train, leading to East Germany's first (and as matters turned out last) free and fair election in March 1990 and then, formally in October 1990, German reunification. At the hitherto important Berlin Economics Academy Carola Bluhm's career prospects disappeared. In 1990 she was informed succinctly in writing that she was being temporarily laid off ("in Warteschleife geschickt") and six months later, her job disappeared permanently (although according to her own website she remained, at least formally, an employee of the Berlin Economics Academy till early in 1991). Unemployment, hitherto a theoretical issue that she had researched and on which she had taught as an academic, became her personal reality.

The old Socialist Unity Party ("Sozialistische Einheitspartei Deutschlands" / SED), hitherto the ruling party in the East German one-party dictatorship, now embarked on a sometimes uncomfortable relaunch for a democratic future, part of which involved rebranding itself as the Party of Democratic Socialism (PDS). Bluhm was one of those who stuck with the party, becoming a PDS member during 1990. The switch to more active involvement in politics happened almost by accident that same year when an elderly longstanding friend from her local district became ill and asked her to attend a party meeting called to select candidates as his representative. She attended and was herself and spontaneously decided to apply for a candidacy on her own account. Her commitment to using the unfolding political changes as a chance to reform the German Democratic Republic from a left wing perspective but embracing emancipation and democracy in ways that, traditionally, the SED had not. There was talk of a "third way". Her ideas caught the mood of the meeting and she found herself selected as a PDS candidate for the city centre electoral district of East Berlin in the forthcoming city council elections - the first such elections to be held on a free and fair basis. The party's lead candidate was a man called Hans Luft, but Bluhm's second place on the party list turned out to be sufficient to ensure her election to the city council ("").

Following reunification, from January 1991 she became a member of Berlin's House of Representatives ("Abgeordnetenhaus"), now covering what had previously been both East and West Berlin. Working with city politicians who had cut their teeth with the very different socio-economic preconceptions and in the very different democratic context of West Berlin involved an intense learning curve for all concerned, and "very intensive debates" were not infrequent. Between 1995 and 2001 she chaired the PDS group in the Berlin House of representatives, jointly with Harald Wolf: then, in 2001, she became deputy chair. Between 2006 and 2009 she was herself chair of the PDS parliamentary group in the assembly. Directly before that, from 2004 and 1006, she was a member of the assembly's enquiry commission "A future for Berlin".

between 2009 and 2011, she served as senator for Integration, Work and Social Affairs in the Red–red coalition administration of Klaus Wowereit, taking on the post following the retirement 0of the previous incumbent, Heidi Knake-Werner. At the 2011 local election the Red–red coalition lost its majority. The PDS went into opposition while city governance passed to a grand coalition of the SPD and CDU. Bluhm, with the other PDS senators, accordingly resigned her senatorial responsibilities. The party recovered its position in the 2016 state election and returned to city governance. Bluhm now returned, albeit briefly, to her position as chair of the party group in the assembly, this time jointly with Udo Wolf.
