= Michael Dietmann =

German politician (born 1968)

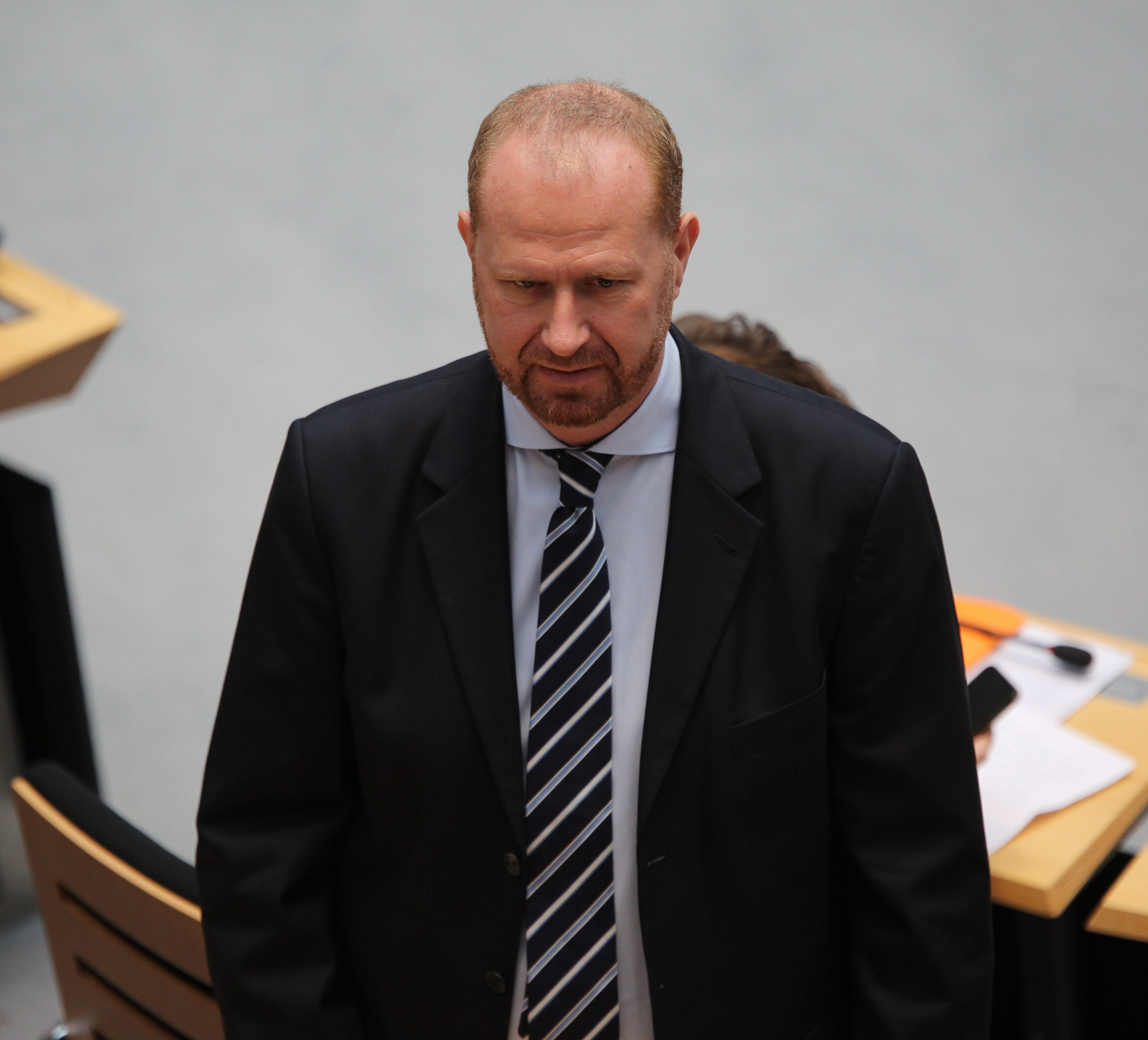
- Dietmann in 2016

Member of the Berlin House of Representatives
- Incumbent
- Assumed office 30 November 1995
- Preceded by: Frank Steffel
- Constituency: Reinickendorf 7 (1995–1999); Reinickendorf 5

Personal details
- Born: 29 June 1968 (age 58)
- Party: Christian Democratic Union (since 1985)

Michael Dietmann (born 29 June 1968) is a German politician serving as a member of the Berlin House of Representatives since 1995. From 1993 to 2021, he served as chairman of the Christian Democratic Union in Märkisches Viertel.
