= Kristian Ronneburg =

German politician

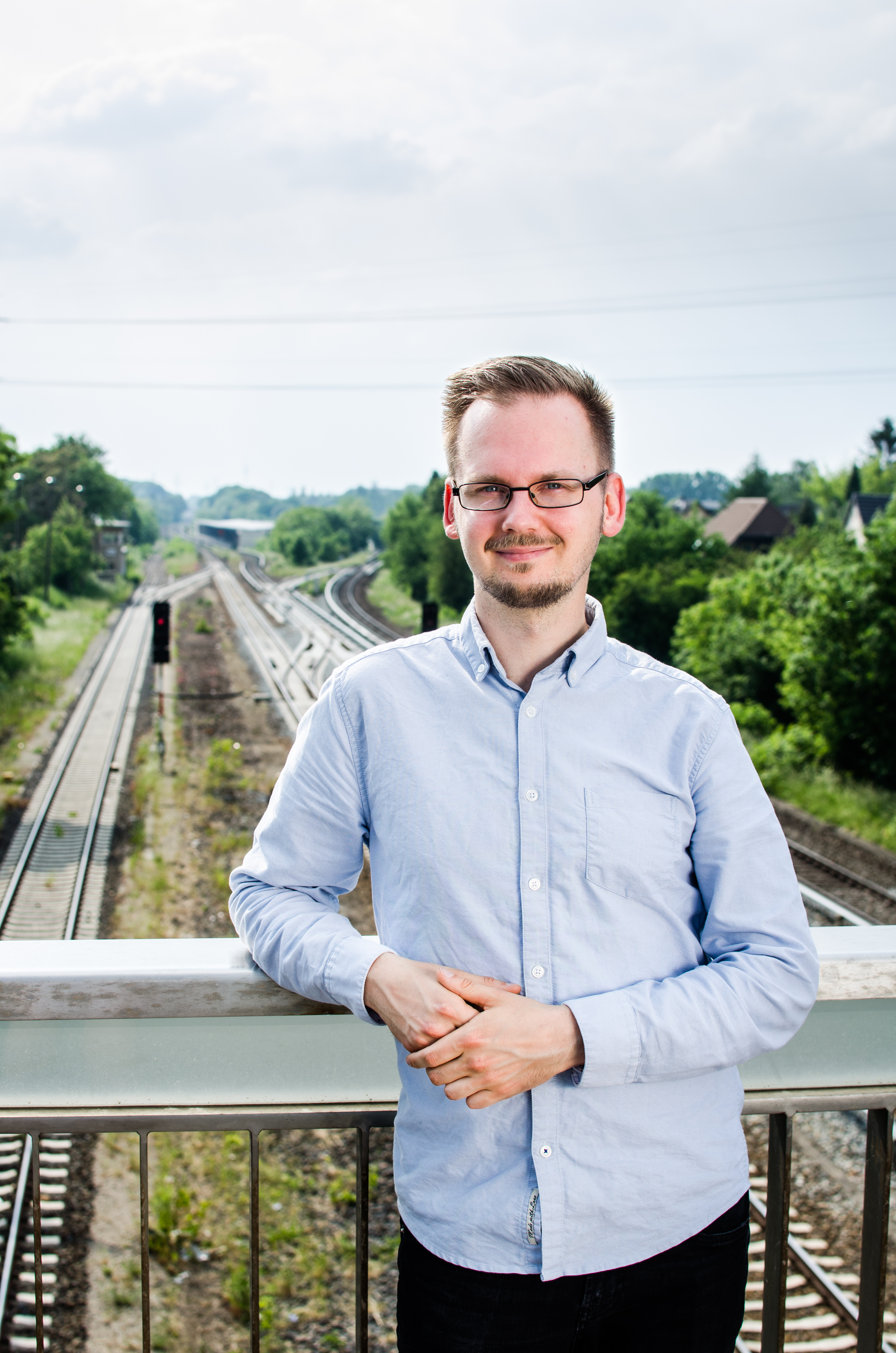

Member of the Abgeordnetenhaus of Berlin
- Incumbent
- Assumed office 27 October 2016
- Constituency: Marzahn-Hellersdorf 6

Personal details
- Born: 22 October 1986 (age 39) Magdeburg, Germany
- Party: The Left
- Occupation: Politician
- Profession: Social scientist

Kristian Ronneburg (born 22 October 1986) is a German politician, currently serving as Member of the Abgeordnetenhaus of Berlin since 22 October 2016 representing the Marzahn-Hellersdorf 6 constituency for The Left.

== Education ==
Bertram was born in Magdeburg but grew up in Marzahn-Hellersdorf. He received his Abitur from Wilhelm-von-Siemens-Gymnasium in Berlin and graduated with a Bachelor of Social Sciences from Otto von Guericke University Magdeburg.

== Political career ==
Prior to entering the Abgeordnetenhaus, Ronneburg served as a borough councillor in Marzahn-Hellersdorf. At the 2016 election Ronneburg was elected as Member of the Abgeordnetenhaus for the Marzahn-Hellersdorf 6 constituency. He is The Left party group spokesperson on petitions.
