= Carsten Schatz =

German politician (born 1970)

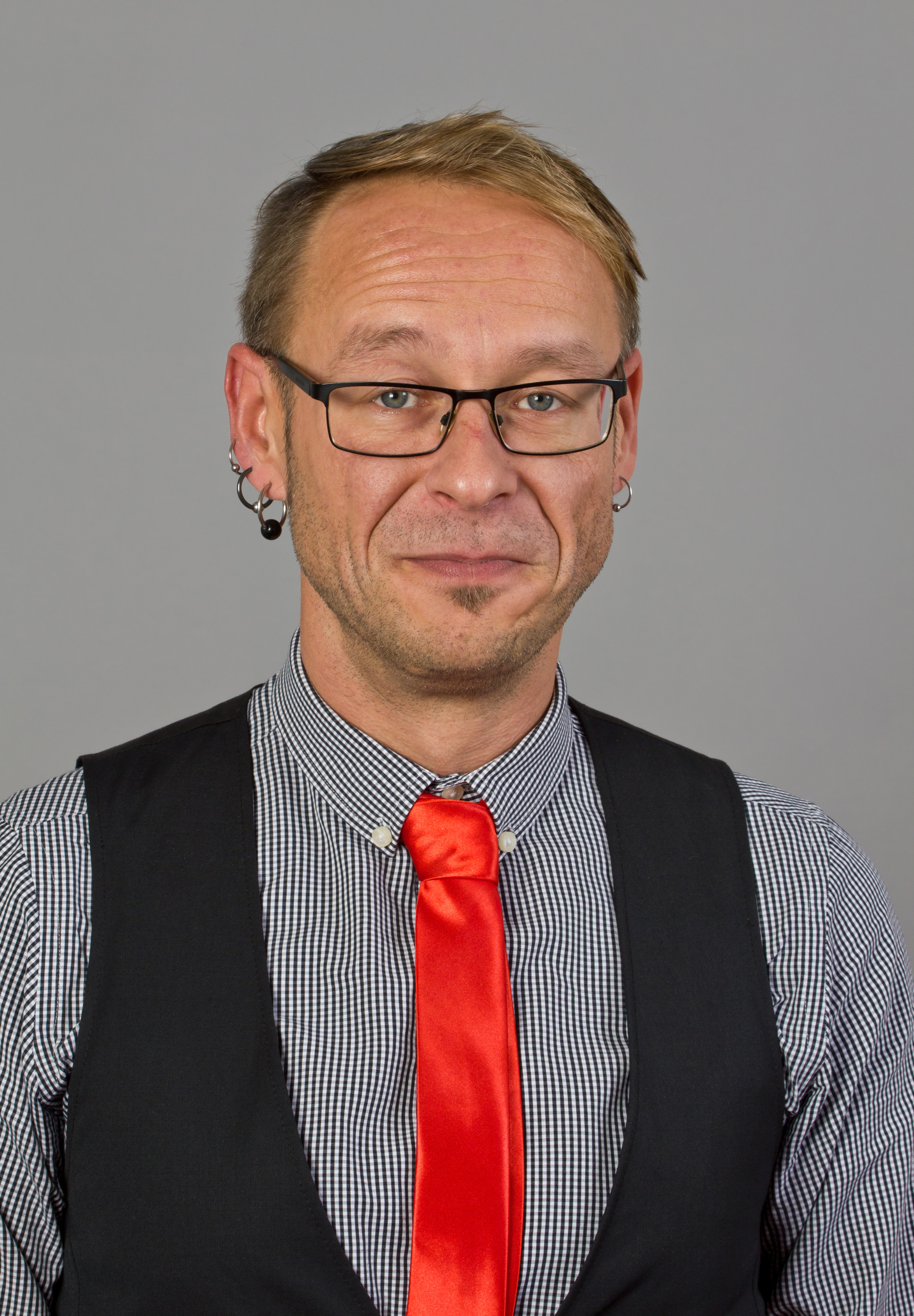
Carsten Schatz

Carsten Schatz (born 10 January 1970) is a German historian and politician currently serving as an independent member of the Abgeordnetenhaus of Berlin.

He lives in Berlin, and joined the Socialist Unity Party in East Germany in 1988. He became the local manager of the PDS (which would later become part of Die Linke) in Berlin in 2001, and a member of the Abgeordnetenhaus of Berlin, the state parliament of Berlin, since 2013. He left Die Linke following an internal party conflict on antisemitism and the war in Gaza.

He is openly gay, and is the first openly HIV-positive person to hold political office in Germany.
