= Feminist blog =

Blog that presents the issues of feminism

A feminist blog presents the issues of feminism through a blog. These websites emerged in the late 1990s and early 2000s, and focus on issues such as gender equality, women's rights, and social justice, among other topics related to feminism. These platforms offer unique perspectives and insights, providing a voice for feminist discourse and activism in the digital age.

Feminist blogs played a role in the evolution of feminist movements by democratizing access to feminist theories and discussions, thus broadening the scope of who can participate and how. These sites were characterized by their informal yet incisive writing style, and they engaged with a young, predominantly female audience. They played a crucial role in third-wave feminism, emphasizing personal experiences and intersectionality.

== History ==
The rise of feminist blogs coincided with the expansion of the internet, where the ease of creating and maintaining a blog allowed many to express their views without the need for mainstream media gatekeepers. Platforms like Blogger, LiveJournal, and WordPress provided the necessary tools for these voices to be heard, leading to a proliferation of feminist content online.

By many accounts, the latter half of the 2000s and first half of the 2010s represented the "heyday" of the independent feminist blogosphere. Eventually, pressure to professionalize and monetize posed challenges. As feminist blogs grew, so did need for staff to maintain them, and the pressure to monetize the content through advertising, sponsorships, and partnerships. This commercialization sometimes led to a dilution of the independent and radical voices that had characterized the early days of feminist blogging.

In pursuit of financial sustainability, many blogs either transitioned into more formal media organizations, requiring significant structural changes, or phased out due to the inability to support full-time staff and operational costs. For instance, The Toast announced its closure in 2016, citing financial pressures despite its popularity and critical acclaim.

Despite their decline, the legacy of feminist blogs remains significant. They were pioneers in using the internet for activism and set the stage for the modern feminist movements seen today in the #MeToo and #TimesUp movements. These blogs also nurtured a generation of writers and activists who continue to influence feminist discourse across various media.

Today, the spirit of feminist blogging lives on through newer formats and platforms, with podcasts, video blogs (vlogs), and multimedia journalism carrying the torch. These successors have adapted to the changing digital landscape, ensuring that feminist discourse continues to evolve and impact global conversations about gender and equality.

== Notable examples ==
Notable feminist blogs include:

- Feministing Founded in 2004 by Jessica Valenti, Feministing served as an incubator for young feminist writers. The blog offered sharp analysis and commentary on feminist issues and played a pivotal role in shaping feminist thought among younger audiences. It closed in 2019
- Jezebel Launched in 2007 as part of Gawker Media, Jezebel aimed to address women's issues with a witty and irreverent tone. It quickly became known for its critical takes on popular culture, media, and politics from a feminist perspective.
- The Hairpin The Hairpin was launched in 2010 as part of The Awl network and provided a mix of humorous and serious articles, personal essays, and cultural criticism. It was celebrated for its eclectic content and engaging storytelling that resonated with a feminist audience.
- Autostraddle Autostraddle started in 2009 as a blog aimed at lesbian, bisexual, and queer women. It has grown into a comprehensive platform covering a range of topics from queer culture to news, entertainment, and politics, all from a feminist perspective.
- Feministe One of the oldest feminist blogs, Feministe was founded in 2001. It is a community blog, where various contributors discuss issues related to feminism, social justice, and activism.
- The Toast Founded in 2013 by Nicole Cliffe and Daniel M. Lavery, The Toast was known for its literary and cultural commentary with a feminist slant. It became a beloved site for its distinctive voice and the way it nurtured a community around feminist and queer topics.
