= Something That May Shock and Discredit You =

2020 memoir by Daniel M. Lavery

- Author: Daniel M. Lavery (Note: The book was initially published under the name Daniel Mallory Ortberg.)
- Genre: Memoir
- Published: February 11, 2020
- Publisher: Atria Publishing Group
- Publication place: United States
- Pages: 256
- ISBN: 1-9821-0521-6

Something That May Shock and Discredit You is a memoir, arranged in the form of a series of essays, by the American writer Daniel M. Lavery. It was published on February 11, 2020, by Atria Publishing Group. The book explores topics including gender and gender transition as well as popular culture and theology.

Something That May Shock and Discredit You is Daniel M. Lavery's third book, and the first one written after he began his gender transition. The book is composed of 41 self-contained essays, divided into 22 "chapters" and 19 shorter and more experimental "interludes". Various genres and subjects are explored in these essays; recurring themes include Jacob wrestling with the angel and Lavery's Christian upbringing.

The book received positive reviews, with reviewers generally describing it as cohesive and insightful despite its unusual structure and tone. It was praised for avoiding common tropes related to the subject of gender transition.

== Background ==
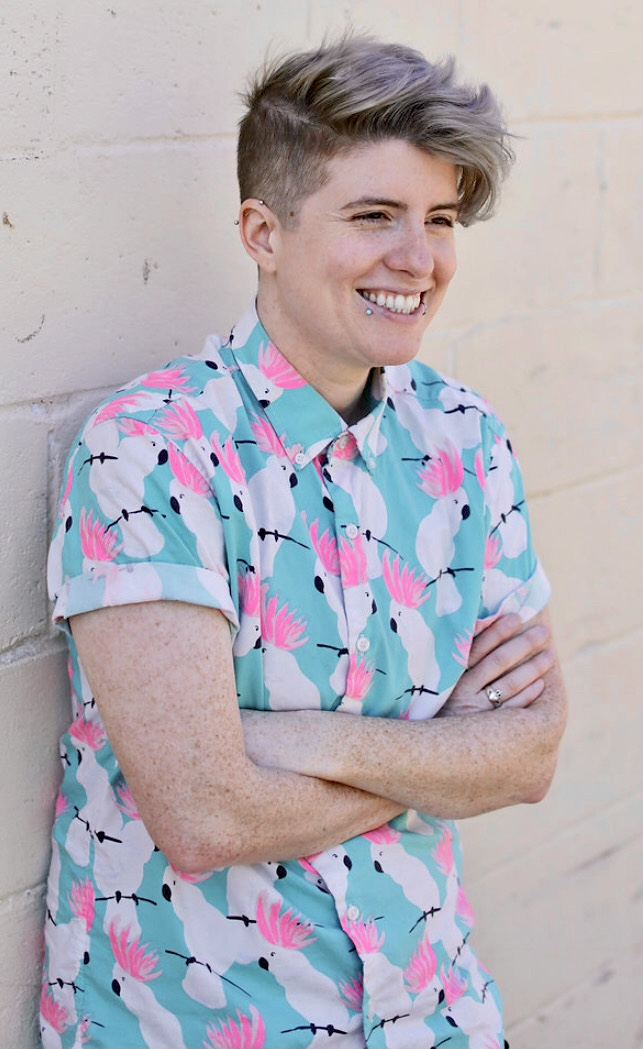
Author Daniel M. Lavery in 2018

Lavery's writing career began with The Toast, a feminist website that he cofounded with Nicole Cliffe in 2013. In 2015, he published his first book, Texts from Jane Eyre. His second book, The Merry Spinster, was published in 2018, a few days after he came out as transgender. Something That May Shock and Discredit You was Lavery's third book, written after he began his gender transition.

Lavery grew up in an evangelical family, and themes from Christianity feature prominently in Something That May Shock and Discredit You. In the book, Lavery describes "a rootless homesickness that translated quite neatly, for a religious 11-year-old, into heaven-longing; later it would translate quite neatly, for a nervous 31-year-old, into transexuality". Between the ages of 5 and 22, Lavery engaged in Bible study several days a week for several hours per day; he has described biblical characters and stories as "wallpapered in [his] brain".

In 2019, Lavery reported his father, Menlo Church pastor John Ortberg, for allowing a congregant - Lavery’s brother - with "obsessive sexual feelings about young children" to continue having unsupervised interaction with children. Lavery subsequently cut ties with his biological family and revised the book two weeks before its publication to remove positive characterizations of his father.

=== Title ===
The phrase "Something That May Shock and Discredit You" comes from a scene in The Simpsons in which Lionel Hutz is attempting to discredit Apu Nahasapeemapetilon, a witness with an eidetic memory. After the witness correctly states what tie Hutz is wearing, Hutz responds "I have something to tell you, something that may shock and discredit you" while visibly attempting to remove the tie, and then claims he is not actually wearing a tie. Lavery told Sam Sanders that "in that moment, it felt like there was so much about, you know, masks coming off, layers coming off [...] pretty early in the writing process, I landed on that title." He explained to Calvin Kasulke that Hutz "pretends he's not [wearing a tie], but he is, and it does not in fact discredit the person he's talking to. It discredits himself."

=== Publication ===
Something That May Shock and Discredit You was published on February 11, 2020, by Atria Publishing Group. It has 256 pages.

== Content ==
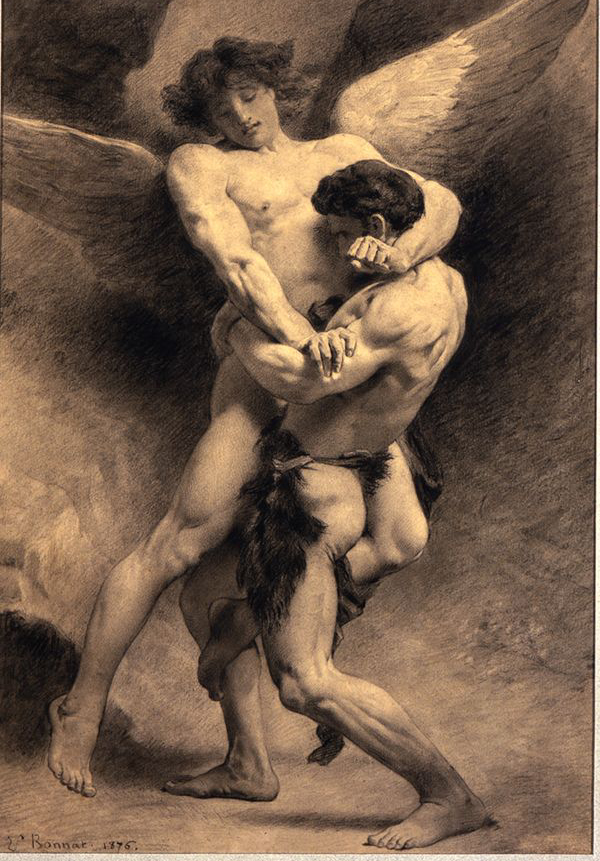
Jacob wrestling with the angel, depicted in this painting by Léon Bonnat, is a recurring theme in the book

Something That May Shock and Discredit You is a memoir that discusses gender and gender transition as well as popular culture and theology, through a series of personal essays. The book includes 22 chapters as well as 19 interludes; all of these are self-contained essays, with the interludes generally being shorter and more experimental than the chapters. Various writing genres are represented, including chivalric romance, bible stories, and Westerns. Recurring themes include Jacob wrestling with the angel and Lavery's upbringing as a Christian. Essay titles include "Chapter Titles from the On-the-Nose, Po-Faced Transmasculine Memoir I Am Trying not to Write", "How I Intend to Comport Myself When I Have Abs Someday", and "Captain James T. Kirk Is a Beautiful Lesbian and I'm Not Sure Exactly How to Explain That".

One essay from the book, titled "Sir Gawain Just Wants to Leave Castle Make-Out", is made up of two sections. The first is a rewriting of Sir Gawain and the Green Knight as a play made up entirely of text messages, while the second revisits Lavery's early experiences of romance:

Perhaps it would have been better for me if I could have seen the movie 'Velvet Goldmine' or heard of the Smiths at that age instead, and transitioned at fourteen. I might have called myself Trenton and had a cis boyfriend at fifteen; I might even today be five foot ten instead of five foot seven and a half inches tall. But I did not have access to 'Velvet Goldmine' or the Smiths; I had access to Alannah Myles and Sir Gawain and the church and was going to have to make do with what I had.

— Daniel M. Lavery, "Sir Gawain Just Wants to Leave Castle Make-Out"

In an interview for Electric Literature, Lavery told Calvin Kasulke that the book "feels more memoir-adjacent than memoir" because it includes "mostly the thoughts in about a 20 to 24 month period of my life immediately preceding and then in the first year and a half or so of my transition, and then also every thought that ever led me to that point." He told The Wall Street Journal that while he wanted to be open about his thoughts and feelings, he also "wanted to keep a lot more privacy around" the details of his relationships with others, and that obscuring the latter allowed him to elaborate on the former.

== Reception ==
=== Reviews ===
In The New York Times Book Review, Jordy Rosenberg stated that the nonlinear narrative of Something That May Shock and Discredit You makes it "addictively strange and delightful". He described Lavery as a "lapidarist of gender transition" and praised his avoidance of common tropes related to the subject, such as "tragic transness" and self-righteousness. Sam Sanders additionally noted that the book avoids tropes about gender transition, noting as an example that it explores Lavery's attempts to convince himself not to transition rather than presenting the decision as easy.

Something That May Shock and Discredit You received a starred review in Kirkus Reviews. The review stated that "what makes these wide-ranging essays work as a coherent collection is the author's poignant reflections on faith and gender" and described Lavery as "refreshingly unafraid of his own uncertainty", concluding that "everyone should read this extraordinary book." In Publishers Weekly, Nino Cipri described Lavery's writing style in the book as "erudite, self-effacing, and welcoming" and noted his use of biblical parables to discuss gender transition. A review in The New Yorker praised Lavery's ability to switch between "criticism, personal essay, and literary pastiche" and described the book as "a road map for navigating one remarkable writer's mind." In Happy Mag, Dan Shaw wrote a positive review of Something That May Shock and Discredit You, and stated that "you might think of it as a stream of consciousness, but that would belie the chiselled articulation of the prose [...] it's an adventure, but a guided one".

A positive review by Constance Grady in Vox described Something That May Shock and Discredit You as "odd and self-satisfied and bizarrely specific, in all the best possible ways." Grady praised the book as humorous but also "tenderly, gently thoughtful about gender and about what it means to transition". In the New York Journal of Books, Annette Lapointe pointed out that much of the book is indirectly autobiographical, characterized by the use of "highly familiar, casual language" to describe "very specific, far-from-general experiences". She described it as "emotionally effective, but not always entirely accessible" and stated that it was both Lavery's least accessible book and his most important one. In the Winnipeg Free Press, Jill Wilson wrote that Something That May Shock and Discredit You "can be tough to follow" but "may reveal more about the experience of transitioning" than memoirs which are written more directly, and concluded that the book is "the laugh-out-loud, head-scratcher, soul-searcher of a transmasculine memoir you didn't know you needed".

A review in The A.V. Club, which gave Something That May Shock and Discredit You a letter grade of B+, described the text as "three eloquent books in one" in reference to its combination of essays, memoir, and cultural analysis. Characterizing Lavery as "as nimble a storyteller as they come", it pointed out that the book had no chronology and stated that it was "occasionally circuitous but always insightful", concluding that Lavery has "created a deeply personal language for a deeply personal story." In The Daily Californian, Alex Jiménez rated the book 5 out of 5, writing that "through individualized commentary on both popular and high art, Lavery lays himself out in pieces and puts them back together, one quippy chapter after another." She characterized the book as a cohesive work despite Lavery's use of various genres and non-chronological order.

=== Lists ===
Vox book critic Constance Grady included Something That May Shock and Discredit You in a list of the 15 best books she read in 2020, describing it as "a gleeful, incredibly specific and improbably deeply relatable joy-read". In USA Today, it topped the list of "5 books not to miss" from the week of February 8, 2020. It was among The A.V. Club's "15 favorite books of 2020".

BuzzFeed News included it in a May 2021 list of "12 Great Books That Challenge Toxic Masculinity", with writer Alex McElroy describing it as "a genre-blending pastiche" that is "equal parts elusive and honest". In The Guardian, it was included on a March 2020 list of "books to enjoy while in quarantine".

== See also ==
- Hybrid genre
