= List of Protestant authors =

This list of Protestant authors presents a group of authors who have expressed membership in a Protestant denominational church or adherence to spiritual beliefs which are in alignment with Protestantism as a religion, culture, or identity. The list does not include authors who, while considered or thought to be Protestant in faith, have rarely expressed or declared their affiliation in a public forum.

Criteria for inclusion on the list are those authors that have received worldwide recognition for their contributions in religious literature. Areas of specialty and denominations are added according to consensus, as needed. Current specialties include the following:

- Allegory
- Anthropology
- Apologetics
- Bibliology
- Biography
- Christology
- Cosmology
- Ecclesiology
- Eschatology
- Exegesis
- Expository
- Fiction
- Hermeneutics
- History of religion
- Literalism
- Memoirs
- Phenomenology
- Philosophy
- Pneumatology
- Poetry
- Prophecy
- Psychology
- Screenwriting
- Sociology
- Soteriology
- Teleology
- Theodicy
- Translations

The list of authors is categorized according to denomination.

== Anabaptist ==
- Petr Chelčický (born c. 1390–died c. 1460) – 15th century political leader from Bohemia (now the Czech Republic)

== Alliance ==
- Ravi Zacharias – evangelical writer from India

== Anglican ==
- C.S. Lewis – author of Mere Christianity
- Diana Butler Bass – author and church historian
- Lancelot Andrewes (1555–1626) – English bishop and scholar, who oversaw the translation of the King James Version of the Bible
- Legh Richmond – The Dairyman's Daughter
- Maria Francesca Rossetti – author and nun
- James Madison (1751–1836) – fourth President of the United States (1809–1817), the “Father of the Constitution” and the key champion and author of the United States Bill of Rights
- Robert Potter (1831-1908) Minister — author of The Germ Growers
- Jakob Abbadie – Swiss writer
- Jakob Jocz – third generation Hebrew Christian
- Jupiter Hammon (1711–died c. 1806) – former slave and poet from New York
- Peter Heylin or Heylyn (1599–1662) – English clergyman and author of many polemical, historical, political and theological tracts
- Samuel Butler (1613–1680) – author of the religious and political satire Hudibras

== Baptist ==
- John Ankerberg (born 1945) – apologist from Chicago, Illinois
- Alfred James Broomhall
- Benjamin Broomhall (1829–1911) – missionary and administrator of the China Inland Mission from Bayswater, London
- Marshall Broomhall
- John Bunyan (1628–1688) – allegorical author of The Pilgrim's Progress from London, England
- Alice Blanchard Coleman (1858–1936) – missionary society leader; author of periodical religious literature
- Bob Cornuke (born 1951) – biblical archeologist from Colorado Springs, Colorado
- Martha Foster Crawford – writer and missionary
- Thomas Dixon (1864–1946) – novelist, playwright, state legislator, and author of The Clansman from North Carolina
- John Gill (1697–1771) – biblical scholar and expository author from Horsleydown, Southwark, England
- Billy Graham (1918–2018) – radio, television, and crusade evangelist from Charlotte, North Carolina
- Marilla Baker Ingalls (1828–1902) – missionary to Burma
- David Jeremiah (born 1941) – radio and television evangelist, pastor, and expository author from El Cajon, California
- Adoniram Judson (1788–1850) – missionary to Burma; translated the Bible from English to Burmese
- Benjamin Keach (1640–1704) – author of scriptural parables and catechism from Southwark, South London, England
- William Garrett Lewis
- John Piper
- Bernard Ramm – Christian apologetics
- John Rippon
- Charles Haddon Spurgeon
- Rick Warren
- Kenneth N. Taylor – linked to Moody Bible Institute
- E. W. Kenyon

== Brethren ==
- Lillian Resler Keister Harford – church organizer, editor, author
- K.V. Simon – poet from India

== Congregationalist ==
- John Adams – religious worker whose poems speak of "flaming piety"
- Thomas Binney – Congregationalist theologian and poet
- Samuel Dyer
- Jonathan Edwards
- William Ellis – missionary who wrote Madagascar Revisited
- George MacDonald – Congregationalist pastor
- John Milton – Paradise Lost
- Marilynne Robinson – Gilead, 2005 Pulitzer Prize winner
- John Updike – Rabbit, Run, raised Lutheran, later belonged to Congregationalist and Episcopalian congregations

== Congregationalist and Puritan ==
- James Janeway

== Lutheran ==
- Mikael Agricola – founding figure in Finnish literature
- Marva Dawn – theological writing
- Garrison Keillor – humorist
- John Warwick Montgomery – Christian apologetics
- Hallgrímur Pétursson – Lutheran priest, poet, and hymnodist

== Methodist (inclusive of the holiness movement) ==
- William F. Albright – Methodist archaeologist who writes on Bible archaeology
- Esther E. Baldwin – missionary, teacher, translator, writer, editor
- Julia Colman – temperance educator, activist, editor, writer
- Edward Eggleston – Methodist minister and author
- Arno Clemens Gaebelein – Methodist minister and writer
- Annie Ryder Gracey – author and missionary
- Phoebe Knapp – Methodist hymnwriter
- Augustus Baldwin Longstreet – Methodist minister and humorist
- Mary A. Miller – Methodist historian, editor, and publisher
- William Williams Pantycelyn – Methodist hymnwriter
- George Whitefield
- Alice May Douglas – author of poetry, juvenile literature, non-fiction; newspaper editor
- Daniel Sidney Warner – Church of God minister and founder of Gospel Trumpet Flyer

== Moravian and Hussite ==
- William Cornelius Reichel, historian

== Pentecostal ==
- Benny Hinn – preacher and author
- Jimmy Swaggart - preacher and author

== Plymouth Brethren ==
- Arthur Charles Gook – English to Icelandic translations of literature, poems, and hymns

== Presbyterian ==
- Pearl S. Buck – parents were missionaries, but she later left the religion
- Belle Caldwell Culbertson - foreign missionary, home missionary, author on religious matters, and philanthropist
- Elisabeth Elliot – missionary
- Johnny Hart – cartoonist, on the evangelical end of Presbyterianism
- Emrys ap Iwan – Welsh Presbyterian minister who wrote for newspapers, etc.
- Timothy Keller – Senior pastor of Redeemer Presbyterian Church in New York City, author of The Reason for God.
- Catherine Marshall – author of "Christy" and "A Man Called Peter"
- John Ortberg – Senior pastor of Menlo Park Presbyterian Church, author of If You Want to Walk on Water, You've Got to Get Out of the Boat.
- Robert Louis Stevenson – wrote on religious matters at times
- Thomas Vincent
- Andrew Young – poet and botanical writer (later an Anglican priest)
- Frederick Buechner – novelist, theologian, and minister
- Horatius Bonar – minister in the Free Church of Scotland and a poet
- Alexander Campbell Cheyne – Scottish ecclesiastical historian
- Henry Drummond – Free Church of Scotland writer
- George Adam Smith – books concerning the Bible
- Francis Schaeffer

== Quaker ==
- Bathsheba Bowers
- Esther G. Frame
- Sally Nicholls
- Eric Knight
- William Cooper

== Reformed ==
- Nicolaas Beets – novelist and poet
- Corrie ten Boom – memoirist
- Edward Tanjore Corwin – history writing
- James Isaac Good – history writing
- Martha Hooper Blackler Kalopothakes – missionary, journalist, translator
- Andrew Murray – religious and inspirational writing

== United Protestant ==
- Ralph Connor – Canadian clergyman and bestselling novelist

== Other ==
- Edith Jessie Archibald – suffragist and writer
- Doug Batchelor - Pastor and president of Amazing Facts
- Ethel Barrett – Christian author and children's author
- Mary Charlotte Ward Granniss Webster Billings – writer, activist, hymn writer, evangelist, missionary
- Ted Dekker – bestselling novelist
- Henry Grattan Guinness
- Jerry B. Jenkins – co-author of the Left Behind books and Gil Thorp comics
- Hal Lindsey – end-times author
- Josh McDowell – Christian writer
- Ra'ouf Mus'ad – Protestant playwright of Coptic ancestry
- J. Dwight Pentecost
- Geraldine Taylor
- Hudson Taylor
- Phyllis Wheatley (1753–died c. 1784) – former slave and poet from Boston, Massachusetts and Senegal, Africa
- Ellen G. White (1827–1915)
