= List of science fiction literature with Messiah figures =

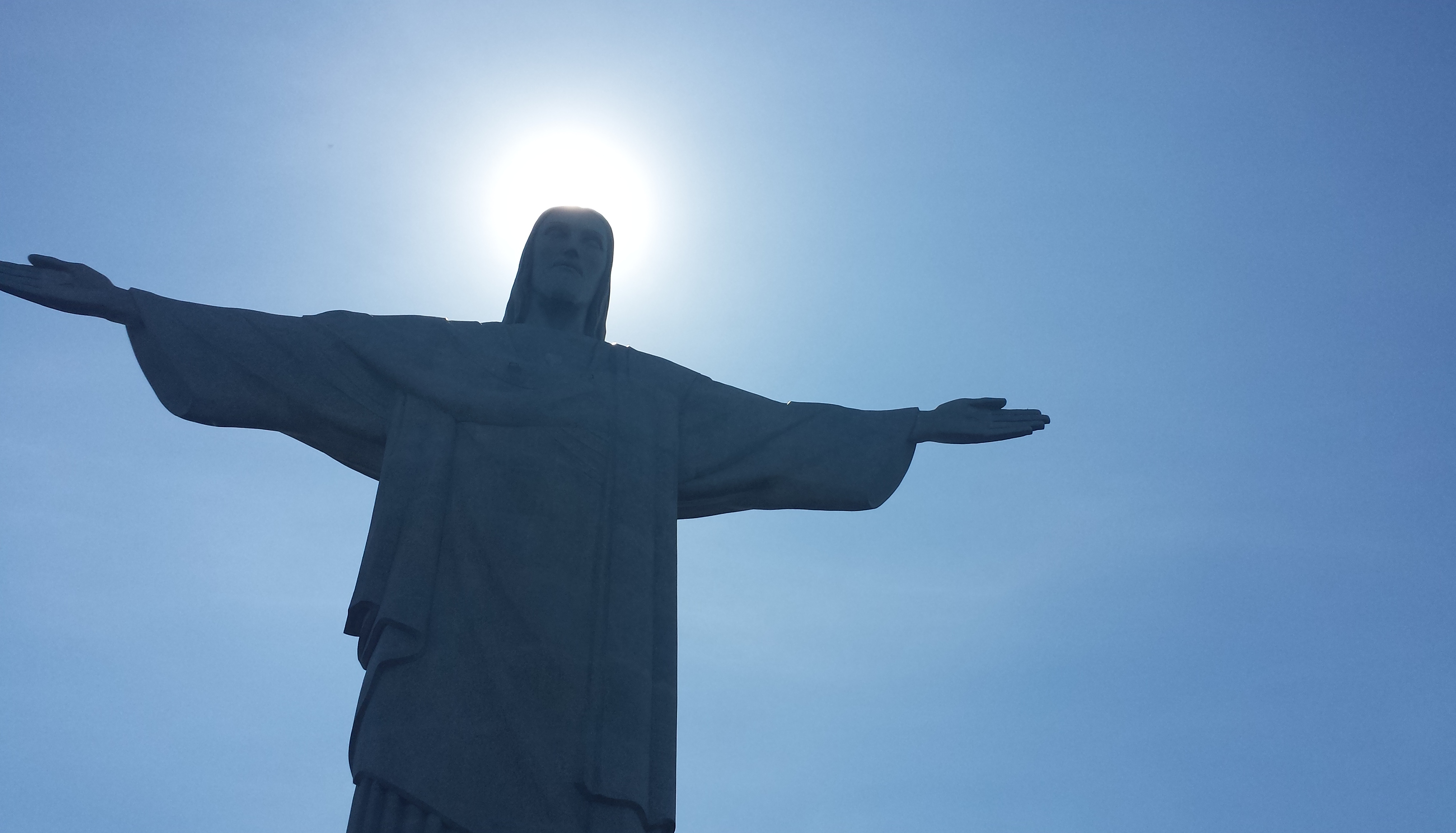

In contrast to theological-scientific works or Jesus novels, which deal with the life and teachings of the Jesus Christ from a religious perspective, science fiction literature places the messianic theme in the context of the fantastique, such as time travel, space travel, alternative realities, parallel worlds, distant planets with extraterrestrial life, paranormal abilities, futuristic cybernetics, reproductive cloning, etc.

Messiah figures, who are "sometimes depicted unsympathetically as deluded, dishonest, or misinterpreted figures whose doctrines are more harmful that helpful", are just one aspect of several religious themes that are interpreted in sci-fi literature.

== List of sci-fi literature ==
Title	Author	Form	Year	Editor/Journal	Topic
When the Sleeper Wakes (also The Sleeper Awakes)	H. G. Wells	Novel	1899	Harper & Brothers	Graham falls asleep and wakes up 200 years later as a celebrity and the richest man on earth. He experiences the misery of the workers, refuses to be manipulated by the ruling plutocrats and fights and sacrifices himself for the rebellious masses.
When It Was Dark: The Story of a Great Conspiracy	Cyril Ranger Gull, aka Guy Thorne	Novel	1903	London Greening & Co	A world is plunged into chaos by a conspiracy against the existence of and faith in Jesus.
Around a Distant Star	Jean Delaire (pseudonym of Pauline Celestine Elisa Touchemolin)	Novel	1904	John Long Ltd	A spaceship equipped with a super telescope flies to a distant planet at 2000 times the speed of light in order to witness the last days of Christ in retrospect.
Made in His Image	Cyril Ranger Gull	Novel	1906	Hutchinson	A world in chaos is redeemed through renewed faith in Jesus.
"The Baumoff Explosion" (also Eloi, Eloi, Lama Sabachthani)	William Hope Hodgson	Short story	1919	Nash's Magazine	Using a self-invented drug, the scientist Baumoff assumes the identity of Jesus - with terrible consequences for him.
"Jesus Christ in Texas"	William Edward Burghardt Du Bois	Short story	1920	Harcourt, Brace and Howe	The Second Coming of Jesus Christ in 20th century Texas
They Call Me Carpenter: A Tale of the Second Coming	Upton Sinclair	Novel	1922	Boni & Liveright	The Second Coming of Jesus Christ triggers affection and conflict.
This Above All (1943: Above All Else)	Matthew Phipps Shiel	Novel	1933	The Vanguard Press	Companions and followers of Jesus live unrecognized as immortals on earth and wait for his return.
Superman	Jerry Siegel und Joe Shuster	Comic	1938	Action Comics	Stories about the extraterrestrial Kryptonian Kal-El, "a popular culture messiah", who fights for the good cause as the superhuman "saviour of the helpless and suppressed".
"Farewell to the Master"	Harry Bates	Short story	1940	Astounding Science Fiction	An extraterrestrial messiah warns and saves the earth.
What Dreams May Come	John Davys Beresford	Novel	1941	Hutchinson	The protagonist becomes the creator of a utopian society through his dreams.
"The Man"	Ray Bradbury	Short story	1949	Thrilling Wonder	Space travelers on a distant planet learn of the arrival of Jesus.
Time and Again (also Time Quarry and First He Died)	Clifford D. Simak	Novel	1950	Galaxy Science Fiction	A spaceman imbued with psychic powers by aliens returns to a very different Earth.
"The Skull"	Philip K. Dick	Short story	1952	If	Conger can gain release from jail if he kills a man 200 years in the past before this man becomes the founder of an influential anti-technology cult. With the skull of this Founder, Conger travels to the year 1960, where he makes a surprising discovery.
"The Traveller"	Richard Matheson	Short story	1954	Chamberlain Press, Born of Man and Woman	A professor travels back in time to the crucifixion of Jesus to report on it as a neutral observer.
"The Star"	Arthur C. Clarke	Short story	1955	Infinity Science Fiction	Astronauts discover the securely hidden remains of a very Earth-like civilization that was destroyed by a supernova. The lead astrophysicist, a Jesuit, calculates when the light of this explosion could be seen on Earth.
A Canticle for Leibowitz	Walter M. Miller, Jr.	Novel	1959	J. B. Lippincott & Co.	After a global nuclear war, the Jewish electrical engineer Leibowitz preserves books and knowledge of the world as a converted Catholic and order founder. He is tortured and murdered, but over the millennia his image evolves into that of a saint.
"Robot Son"	Robert F. Young	Short story	1959	Fantastic Universe	In a distant future, the machine god, who ensures that everything technological functions, creates a son who demands repentance and worship from people.
Stranger in a Strange Land	Robert Heinlein	Novel	1961	Putnam Publishing Group	The last survivor of the Mars colony is brought to Earth. Equipped with superhuman abilities, he experiences life on Earth, deeply touches the people he meets, is finally killed by the mob, but lives on as a spirit being.
"The Rescuer"	Arthur Porges	Short story	1962	Analog Science Fiction and Fact	A journey back in time to the crucifixion of Jesus in order to save him is prevented.
"The Streets of Ashkelon" (also An Alien Agony)	Harry Harrison	Short story	1962	Brian Aldiss's New Worlds #122	Aliens conduct an experiment to decide between empiricism and faith in the resurrection of Jesus.
"Seven Day's Wonder"	Edward Wellen	Short story	1963	The Magazine of Fantasy and Science Fiction	The Second Coming of Jesus is told in first-person narrator form.
"A Rose for Ecclesiastes"	Roger Zelazny	Short story	1963	The Magazine of Fantasy and Science Fiction	On Mars, the earthling Gallinger learns the high language of the Martians, studies their sacred texts and inadvertently becomes the predicted prophet of a new age.
The Dead Lady of Clown Town	Cordwainer Smith	Novel	1964	Galaxy Science Fiction	A Jeanne d'Arc variant takes place on a distant planet.
The Three Stigmata of Palmer Eldritch	Philip K. Dick	Novel	1964	Doubleday	In an environmentally degradaded world, Palmer Eldritch facilitates the lives of millions of people with the alien drug Chew-Z - but Eldritch's identity and intentions are shrouded in mystery.
Behold the Man	Michael Moorcock	Short story	1966	New Worlds	Karl Glogauer travels back in time to the Holy Land. When he finally finds Jesus, he has to make a difficult decision.
You and Me and the Continuum	James Graham Ballard	Novel	1966	Roberts & Vinter	The Second Coming of Jesus in modern times, which is completely different from what was planned.
Lord of Light	Roger Zelazny	Novel	1967	Magazine of Fantasy and Science Fiction	On a distant planet, technically superior earthlings control the existence of the native species like a god. The protagonist Sam is a renegade who fights against this oppression in the role of Siddhartha Gautama.
Jesus Christs	Arthur John Langguth	Novel	1968	Harper & Row	The multiple deaths and subsequent resurrections of Jesus lead to always new situations.
The Masks of Time (also Vornan-19)	Robert Silverberg	Novel	1968	Ballantine Books	A time-traveling messiah from the year 2999 proclaims the future of Earth.
Past Master	Raphael Aloysius Lafferty	Novel	1968	Ace Books	The inhabitants of the planet Astrobe live in prosperity and abundance, but are experiencing social and moral decline. They bring Thomas Moore out of his time to save them with his moral knowledge and show them the right way.
Planet in the Eye of Time	Brian Earnshaw	Novel	1968	Hodder & Stoughton	700 years in the future, students take part in an expedition through a time portal to investigate the miracle of Christ's resurrection.
The Last Starship from Earth	John Boyd (aka Boyd Bradfield Upchurch)	Novel	1968	Weybright & Talley	An AI pope rules an alternative world in which a revolutionary Jesus (without crucifixion) has overthrown the Roman Empire and established a worldwide theocracy.
Isle of the Dead	Roger Zelazny	Novel	1969	Ace Books	The world creator Sandow faces his enemies on his own world in order to save his friends.
Dune Messiah	Frank Herbert	Novel	1969	Putnam Publishing	(Vol. 2 of 6) Paul Atreides is the regent of the desert planet Arrakis and, as “Muad'Dib”, the messiah for the religious Fremen. Before he disappears into the desert as a blind preacher, he must prevail against adversaries within to protect his children.
Messiah Trilogy: vol. 1 The Rector	Anthony Storey	Novel	1970	Rizzoli International Publivations	The Second Coming of Jesus in modern England
"The Messiah" (auch Welcome Aboard)	Ray Bradbury	Short story	1971	Welcome Abord Magazine	A Martian Empath can not only embody Jesus, it must do so.
The Book of Stier	Robin Sanborn	Novel	1971	Berkley Publishing Corporation	As in Tommy, a messiah who appears out of nowhere with alien rock music attracts a large following.
"Eyes of Onyx"	Edward Bryant	Short story	1971	Ballantine Books	In the winter of a bleak future, Juan and his father offer shelter to a pregnant woman and her partner. The father helps with the birth of the baby, who has deep black eyes. Juan has a hunch.
The Astrologer	John Cameron	Novel	1972	Random House	An astrologer investigating reports about the Second Coming of Christ gets into trouble.
Messiah Trilogy: vol. 2 The Centre Holds	Anthony Storey	Novel	1973	Marion Boyars	The Second Coming of Jesus in modern England
"Let's Go to Golgotha!"	Garry Kilworth	Short story	1974	Sunday Times Weekly Review	A journey back in time to the crucifixion of Jesus suggests that the crowd in attendance consists only of time-travel tourists.
Messiah Trilogy: vol. 3 The Saviour	Anthony Storey	Novel	1978	Marion Boyars	The Second Coming of Jesus in modern England
Kalki	Gore Vidal	Novel	1978	Random House	Before an apocalyptic war, the protagonist James J. Kelly stages himself as the reincarnation of the Hindu deity Kalki in an elaborate religious hoax in order to repopulate the earth after the destruction of humanity.
Jesus on Mars	Philip José Farmer	Novel	1979	Pinnacle Press	Jesus, who lives among the Krsh on Mars, travels to Earth with a fleet as a savior, where his arrival triggers affection but also hostility.
The Walking Shadow	Brian M. Stableford	Novel	1979	Fontana	A time traveler, accompanied by his followers and exposed to temptation, wants to ensure the survival of mankind in the distant future.
Smile on the Void: The Mythhistory of Ralph M'Botu Kitaj	Stuart Gordon	Novel	1981	Berkley Publishing Corporation	At the end of the 20th century, the richest man in the world finally realizes his true destiny.
The Divine Invasion	Philip K. Dick	Novel	1981	Timescape Books/Simon & Schuster	Yahweh is reborn, but he, his mother and their friends are in danger - but they are not alone.
Mission	Patrick Tilley	Novel	1981	Little, Brown and Company	Second coming of Jesus: A man wounded in his hands, feet and ribs is found in New York.
The Cross of Fire	Barry N. Malzberg	Novel	1982	Ace Books	A man escapes from a technocratic, cold future by undergoing drug-induced therapy in which he puts himself in the shoes of religious figures, including Jesus, and lives through their lives.
The Gospel According to Gamaliel Crucis (also The Astrogator's Testimony)	Michael Bishop	Novel	1983	Kudzu Planet Productions	Second Coming of Jesus in the form of an extraterrestrial praying mantis
The Man in the Tree	Damon Knight	Novel	1984	Berkley Books	A messianic giant with paranormal powers changes the world.
Godbody	Theodore Sturgeon	Novel	1986	Donald I. Fine	Godbody changes people's lives in a small town in New England, but not everyone likes it.
Only Begotten Daughter	James Kenneth Morrow	Novel	1990	William Morrow and Company	The novel tells the story of Julie Katz, the half-sister of Jesus, who is born through “inverse parthenogenesis” in the United States.
Live from Golgotha	Gore Vidal	Novel	1992	Random House	Time travelers from several eras influence the life of Jesus Christ.
The Hammer of God	Arthur C. Clarke	Novel	1993	Bantam Spectra	An asteroid threatens the technologized world community in which Fatima Magdalene, the prophetess of Chrislam (Christianity, Islam, and computer/brain interface) has her own goals.
Christ Clone Trilogy: vol. 1 In His Image	James BeauSeigneur	Novel	1997	SelectiveHouse	Second coming of Jesus through reproductive cloning of DNA from the Shroud of Turin
Christ Clone Trilogy: vol. 2 Birth of an Age	James BeauSeigneur	Novel	1997	SelectiveHouse	Second coming of Jesus through reproductive cloning of DNA from the Shroud of Turin
Christ Clone Trilogy: vol. 3 Acts of God	James BeauSeigneur	Novel	1997	SelectiveHouse	Second coming of Jesus through reproductive cloning of DNA from the Shroud of Turin
Corrupting Dr. Nice	John Kessel	Novel	1997	Tor Books	Time travel is commonplace in 2063 and the discovery of instant universes avoids time paradoxes. In this way, Jesus can be brought into modern times.
Jesus Video (germ. Das Jesus Video	Andreas Eschbach	Novel	1998	Schneekluth-Verlag	Time travel to the Holy Land
The Light of Other Days	Arthur C. Clarke und Stephen Baxter	Novel	2000	Tor Books	WormCams, which are based on wormhole technology, allow to see into the past and experience world history directly. In reality, Jesus was the illegitimate son of a Roman centurion and had actually visited Great Britain as a youth.
The Jesus Thief	Jamilla Rhines Lankford	Novel	2003	Great Reads Books	Second coming of Jesus through reproductive cloning of DNA from the Shroud of Turin
"Jesus Christ, Animator"	Ken MacLeod	Short story	2007	Pyr	Second coming of Jesus into a very changed world
Punk Rock Jesus	Sean Murphy	Comic	2012	Vertigo Comics	After the Second Coming of Jesus through reproductive cloning of DNA from the Shroud of Turin, he is presented in the media in a reality show. The rebellious Jesus causes adoration and rejection.
The Jesus Deal (germ. Der Jesus-Deal)	Andreas Eschbach	Novel	2014	Lübbe-Verlag	Time travel, the Second Coming of Jesus and the end of times
"Mecha-Jesus"	Derwin Mak	Short story	2014	EDGE Science Fiction and Fantasy Publishing	In a fusion of Christianity and Shintoism, a Jesus android is used as a tourist attraction in a Japanese town.
The Savage Sword of Jesus Christ	Grant Morrison, Matt and Kevin Molen (the Molen Brothers)	Comic	2017	Heavy Metal Magazine 284	Jesus as bodybuilt Nordic Messiah
Second Coming	Mark Russell, Richard Pace	Comic	2020	AHOY Comics	Return of Jesus as sidekick of a superhero

== Bibliography ==
- Brisio Javier Oropeza: The Gospel According to Superheroes: Religion and Pop Culture, Ed. Peter Lang, Reference, Information and Interdisciplinary Subjects Series (2005), ISBN 978-0-8204-7422-9
- Gabriel McKee: The Gospel According to Science Fiction: From The Twilight Zone to the Final Frontier, Presbyterian Publishing Corporation (The Gospel According To... Series (2007), ISBN 978-0-664-22901-6
- James Frank McGrath: Religion and Science Fiction, Ed. James Clarke & Company (2012) ISBN 978-0-7188-4096-9
- James Frank McGrath: Theology and Science Fiction, Cascade Books (Cascade Companions) (2016), ISBN 978-1-4982-0451-4
- Jim Papandrea: From Star Wars to Superman: Christ Figures in Science Fiction and Superhero Films, Sophia Institute Press (2017) ISBN 978-1-62282-388-8
- Gary Wesley Westfahl: Science Fiction Literature Through History: An Encyclopedia (2 volumes), Bloomsbury Publishing (2021) ISBN 979-8-216-14234-8
- Michael Scheibach: Faith, Fallout, and the Future: Post-Apocalyptic Science Fiction in the Early Postwar Era, MDPI, in Religions (2021) Bd. 12(7), p. 520 ff., doi:10.3390/rel12070520
- Frank Bosman: Messiah/Christ, p. 167-186 in Caitlin Salomon: Biblical Themes in Science Fiction, Ed. Nicole L. Tilford and Kelly J. Murphy, SBL Press (2023) ISBN 1-62837-459-4
- Paul J. Nahin: Time Traveling to Jesus, p. 147–174, in Paul J. Nahin: Holy Sci-Fi! Where Science Fiction and Religion Intersect, Springer (2024), ISBN 978-1-4939-0618-5

== See also ==
- Messiah (American TV series)
