= Choire Sicha =

American writer and blogger

- Born: November 19, 1971 (age 54); United States
- Occupations: Writer, editor, blogger
- Writing career
- Genres: Culture, non-fiction

Choire Sicha (/ˈkɔːri ˈsiːkə/ KOR-ee SEE-kə, born November 19, 1971) is an American writer and blogger. In June 2021, he became an editor-at-large at New York; he had been the editor of The New York Times Style section since September 2017. Previously, he served as Vox Media's director of partner platforms, co-editor at Gawker, and a co-founder of The Awl.

== Career ==
Sicha began his writing career as an editor for Gawker, The New York Observer, and Radar Online. He launched The Awl in April 2009, with Alex Balk and David Cho, out of his East Village apartment, after Radar magazine folded. The website, described as a "irreverent, all-purpose, media/culture/politics/think-piece/bear-video clusterfuck" by GQ, was based in downtown Brooklyn. Sicha published his first book, Very Recent History: An Entirely Factual Account of a Year (c. AD 2009) in a Large City in 2013.

In February 2016, Vox Media hired Sicha as its director of partner platforms to oversee the media company's approach to platforms like Facebook's Instant Articles, Snapchat's Discover feature, and Google's Accelerated Mobile Pages initiative.

Sicha became the editor of The New York Times Style section in September 2017. On June 7, 2021, New York announced that Sicha had left The New York Times, and would join the magazine as an editor-at-large.

Sicha joined CNN in 2025.

== See also ==
- Fashion editor
- LGBT culture in New York City
- New Yorkers in journalism
