= Daniel M. Lavery =

American humorist and advice columnist

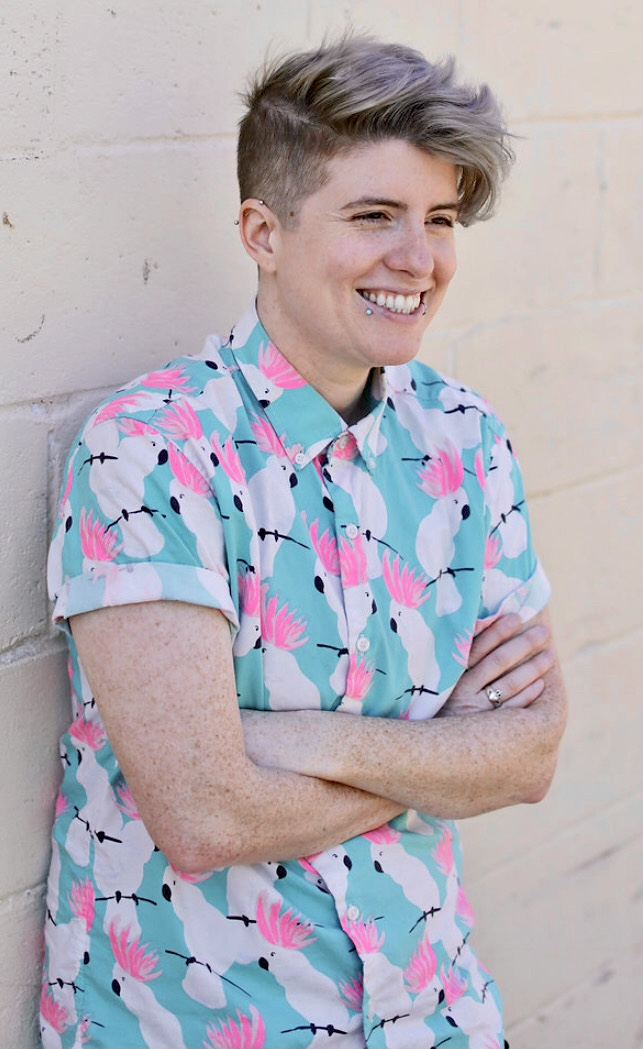
- Lavery in 2018
- Born: November 28, 1986 (age 39)
- Education: Azusa Pacific University
- Occupation: Writer
- Spouse: Grace Lavery
- Relatives: John Ortberg (father)
- Writing career
- Period: 21st century
- Genres: Satire; Short fiction Advice
- Notable works: The Toast; Texts from Jane Eyre; The Merry Spinster; Something That May Shock and Discredit You; Krombopulos Michael; Women's Hotel
- Website: danielmlavery.com

Daniel M. Lavery (born Mallory Ortberg, November 28, 1986) is an American author and editor. He is known for having co-founded the website The Toast, and for having written the books Texts from Jane Eyre (2014), The Merry Spinster (2018), Something That May Shock and Discredit You (2020), and Women's Hotel (2024). Lavery wrote Slate's Dear Prudence advice column from 2016 to 2021. From 2022 to 2023, he hosted a podcast on Slate titled Big Mood, Little Mood. In 2017, Lavery started a paid e-mail newsletter titled Shatner Chatner, renamed to The Chatner in 2021.

== Early life ==
Born Mallory Ortberg on November 28, 1986, Lavery grew up in Northern Illinois and then San Francisco, one of three children of evangelical Christian author and former Menlo Church pastor John Ortberg and pastor and former CEO of Transforming the Bay with Christ Nancy Ortberg. Lavery attended Azusa Pacific University, a private evangelical Christian university in California. While a student, Lavery appeared on Jeopardy! in 2009 and finished in third place.

== Writing ==
=== Influences ===
Lavery has credited the work of Shirley Jackson, in particular her novel We Have Always Lived in the Castle, and John Bunyan's The Pilgrim's Progress as influential.

=== Career overview ===
Lavery wrote for Gawker and The Hairpin. Through this work, he met Nicole Cliffe, with whom he operated The Toast, a feminist general interest web site, from July 2013 to July 2016.

Lavery was included in the 2015 Forbes 30 under 30 list in the media category. On November 9, 2015, Slate announced that he would take over the magazine's Dear Prudence advice column from Emily Yoffe. Lavery stopped writing the column in May 2021.

In 2017, Lavery launched Shatner Chatner, a paid e-mail newsletter. On May 19, 2021, he accepted a Substack Pro deal and shortened the newsletter's name to The Chatner. The Substack Pro program ended in 2022, although Lavery still writes the newsletter.

=== Books ===
==== Texts from Jane Eyre ====
Lavery's first book, Texts from Jane Eyre, was released in November 2014 and became a New York Times best seller. The book was based on a column that he wrote first at The Hairpin, then continued at The Toast, which imagines well-known literary characters exchanging text messages. The premise was inspired by a comments section thread on a piece Cliffe had written for The Awl; on Cliffe's review of Gone With the Wind, a commenter wrote that their experience in the South was nearly identical to the novel "except everybody has cell phones". This prompted Lavery to imagine how Scarlett O'Hara might have used a cell phone.

==== Rick and Morty Presents: Krombopulos Michael ====
Lavery's first comic one-shot, titled Rick and Morty Presents: Krombopulos Michael, was published by Oni Press on June 20, 2018, following the Rick and Morty character of the same name.

==== The Merry Spinster ====
His short story collection, The Merry Spinster: Tales of Everyday Horror (Henry Holt, 2018), was published in 2018. The book, Lavery's second release, was highly anticipated, with Publishers Weekly, Bustle, The A.V. Club, and InStyle Australia including it in their lists of forthcoming titles in 2018. The Merry Spinster reinvents fairy tales such as Cinderella and Beauty and the Beast; in the Los Angeles Times, Agatha French described his renderings as making the "stories both weirder and yet somehow more familiar".

==== Something That May Shock and Discredit You ====
Lavery's third book, a memoir titled Something That May Shock and Discredit You, was published in February 2020 by Simon & Schuster. It was originally published as individual essays.

==== Women's Hotel ====
Lavery's fourth book, a novel titled Women's Hotel, was published in October 2024 by HarperVia. He released the follow-up, Christmas at the Women's Hotel, in October 2025.

== Personal life ==
Lavery identifies as queer. In February 2018, he spoke to Autostraddle about the process of gender transitioning while writing The Merry Spinster. The following month, Lavery was interviewed by Heather Havrilesky in New York magazine's The Cut about coming out as transgender.

In November 2018, Lavery and his girlfriend, Grace Lavery, a professor of English at U.C. Berkeley and "the most followed transgender scholar in the world on social media", announced their engagement. They got married in December 2019. In 2020, they formed a throuple with Lily Woodruff, and together they are raising a son.
