= Story (social media) =

Function in social networking and instant messaging services

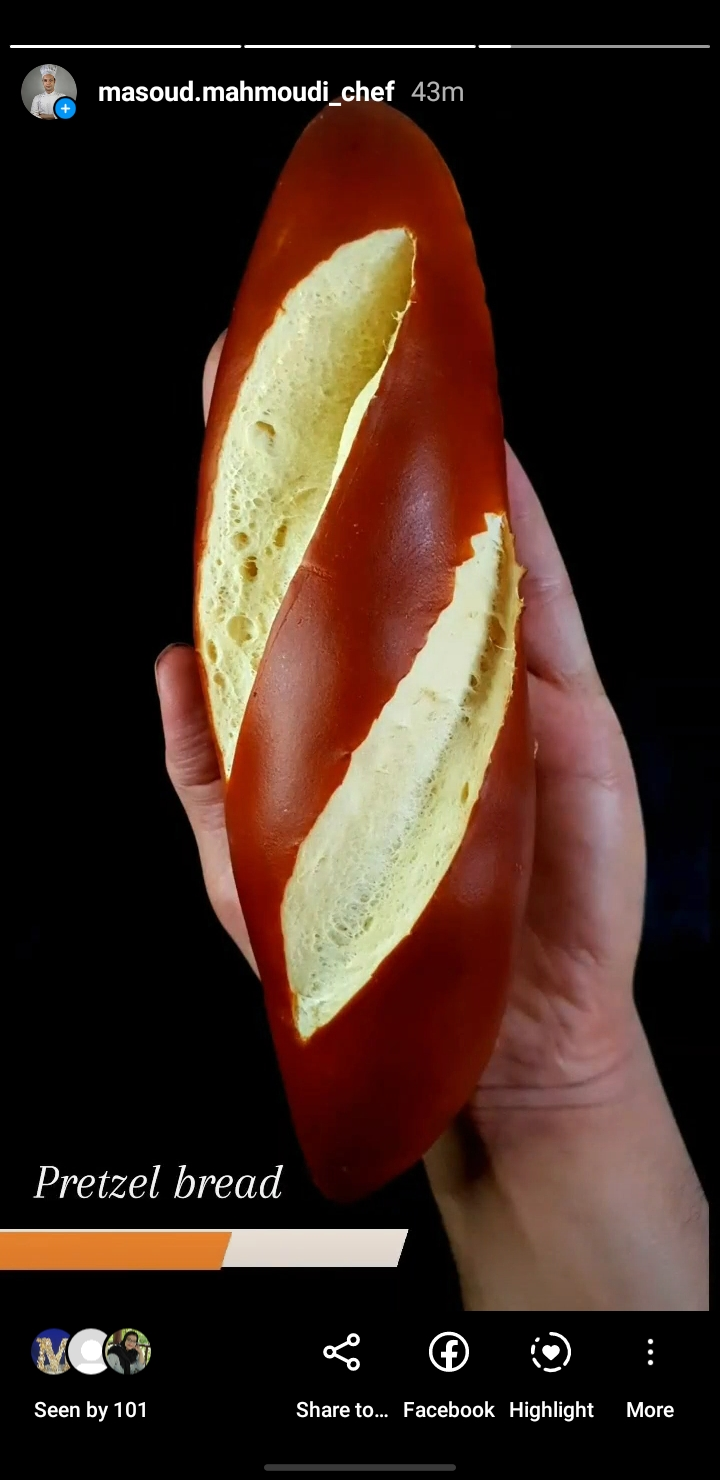
Story on Instagram viewed on a smartphone

In social media, a story is a function in which the user tells a narrative or provides status messages and information in the form of short, time-limited clips in an automatically running sequence.

== Definition ==
A story is a short sequence of images, videos, or other social media content, which can be accompanied by backgrounds, music, text, stickers, animations, filters or emojis. Social media platforms typically advance through the sequence automatically when presenting a story to a viewer. Although the sequential nature of stories can be used to tell a narrative, the pieces of a story can also be unrelated. Social media platforms that offer stories will typically have a primary story for each user which consists of everything the user posted to their story over a certain period of time, usually the most recent 24 hours. Most stories cannot be changed afterwards and are only available for a short time. Stories are almost exclusively created on a mobile device such as a smartphone or tablet computer and are usually displayed vertically.

== History ==
In October 2013, Snapchat first introduced the story function as a series of Snaps that can together tell a narrative through a chronological order, with each Snap being viewable by all of the poster's friends and deleted after 24 hours. Stories soon surpassed private Snaps to become Snapchat's most-viewed type of post. After 2015, Snapchat introduced a feature allowing users to post private stories viewable by a chosen subset of their friends. Later other apps would copy this feature.

In August 2016, Instagram introduced a stories function that deletes the content after 24 hours. Various commenters have accused the site of copying Snapchat.

In February 2017, the instant messenger WhatsApp introduced the Now Status stories function in beta, which was later renamed Status. In March 2017, a story function was introduced in Facebook Messenger.

In February 2018, Google launched AMP Stories, bringing a story-style format to certain Google search results on mobile devices.

In August 2018, YouTube introduced a stories function that initially was limited to pictures, but was later expanded to support short video clips. The feature was shut down in June 2023.

In August 2018, the GIF website Giphy introduced a story function.

In March 2022, TikTok added a story feature which allowed users to create 15 second long videos that delete after 24 hours.

In June 2023, Telegram CEO Pavel Durov announced stories for Telegram would be released in July 2023. In July 2023, the feature was released for premium users, and in August 2023 it was rolled out for all users.

== User motivations ==
In 2022, a study performed by Jia-Dai (Evelyn) Lu and Jhih-Syuan (Elaine) Lin examined the various motivations for updating stories on Instagram. The researchers found a new configuration of motivations for using Instagram Stories: exploration, self-enhancement, perceived functionality, entertainment, social sharing, relationship building, novelty, and surveillance. The findings also highlighted that contribution and creation activities are likely to result in positive emotions, while creation alone predicts negative emotions while updating stories on Instagram.

== Usage statistics ==
In 2019, around 1.5 billion people worldwide every day on average used the stories function in a social network or messenger. Younger people in particular use this function. More than 20% of people aged 18 to 24 use Instagram stories, while it is just under 2% of those over 55.

In a Facebook survey of 18,000 participants from 12 countries, 68% said they used the stories function at least once a month. Stories in the areas of fashion and tourism are particularly popular.

The website Fanpage Karma analyzed several Instagram accounts and determined the average reach of posts and stories per follower, concluding that posts have a higher reach than stories, which often have less than half the reach.
