= Fusion Fire =

Science fiction novel by Kathy Tyers

First edition (publ. Bantam Spectra) Cover artist: Kevin Johnson

Fusion Fire is a science fiction novel by American writer Kathy Tyers; originally published in 1988, it was later rewritten and republished in 2000.

The protagonist is Lady Firebird Angelo, once a "wastling" of a Netaian royal family and now a Federate citizen.

== Plot summary ==
Firebird and new husband Brennen Caldwell being attacked in the middle of the night by someone with telepathic powers, thus of Ehretan heritage.

Firebird continues her study of Netaian political simulations, hoping to stave off societal collapse of her dysfunctional homeworld. She also studies her new religion and telepathy, having accidentally discovered that the Angelo bloodline carried Ehretan genes (and hence Ehretan powers) A second successful turn, during labor, nearly kills her as well. As this uncontrolled ability threatens any telepath that might be near her, she is quarantined—even from her newborn sons.

Meanwhile, Phoena Angelo continues to chafe while Netaia is under Federate occupation, and her latest scheme involves asking the Shuhr for assistance. However, they mentally dominate her and reduce her to an unwitting pawn, using her as a source for exploring the lost Ehretan gene sequences, as well as pillaging the material wealth of Netaia.

Phoena's foppish husband, Tel Tellai, humbles himself by asking Caldwell's assistance in rescuing her, despite the impossible odds. Ongoing diplomatic and military developments force the issue of Phoena's rescue, but Caldwell finally accepts the mission only after a divine vision. Using new technology to amplify his mental abilities, he sets out to infiltrate the Shuhr homeworld of Three Zed in a rescue attempt. He finds Phoena, but is captured. She is tortured to death while the Shuhr enjoyed her psychic screams of pain, at last realizing she'd been played for the fool, and only Brennen is there to mourn her death. The Shuhr leaders extract DNA samples from him for their cloning efforts, and try to force secrets from him. To thwart them, Caldwell gives himself amnesia blocks.

Tel, exposed to non-Netaian ideas for the first time, begins to doubt Phoena's character and motives, though he remains fiercely devoted to her. He also comes to a healthy respect for Caldwell, and the Sentinels and Federacy in general. When Ellet Kinsman, a Sentinel officer and Firebird's romantic rival for Caldwell's affections, shows her how she can pursue and rescue Brennen, Firebird (also after divine guidance) seizes the chance, and takes the matured Tel as her copilot.

On Netaia, Queen Carradee's rule and reforms are seen as ineffectual and even harmful to the ruling class, who force her to abdicate after her chambers are bombed, almost resulting in the death of Prince Consort Daithi Drake-Angelo. Carradee and Daithi are welcomed to Hesed House, the Sentinel retreat, and Daithi is given better medical care than is available on Netaia. As he begins to recover, the two of them also begin to see the Federacy, especially the gentle faith of the Sentinels, in a new light.

Firebird and Tel are discovered, but she is allowed to free Caldwell before they are both captured again. Tel remains in the shuttle, and is mentally incapacitated by the monitoring Shuhr. Caldwell is a wreck, having faced physical and psychic torture for days, and his self-imposed amnesia has progressed to the point where he cannot even remember who Firebird is. Firebird manages to turn again, allowing Caldwell to jumpstart his powers temporarily, overcome their attackers, and escape with Tel's help.

The Federacy discovers the Shuhr were developing their own psi-amplification and fusion technologies, which would have allowed them to dominate every world in that arm of the galaxy.
