= Chris Walley =

Chris Walley may refer to:

- Chris Walley (writer)
- Chris Walley (actor)
