= Bakura =

Bakura may refer to:

- Bakura (Star Wars), a fictional planet within the Star Wars universe
- Ryo Bakura, a Yu-Gi-Oh! character
- Amane Bakura, Ryo Bakura's sister in the Yu-Gi-Oh! manga
- Bakura, Nigeria, a Local Government Area of Zamfara State

== See also ==
- The Truce at Bakura, a 1993 Star Wars novel by Kathy Tyers taking place after Return of the Jedi
- Bankura
