= Nicole Cliffe =

Canadian-American writer and journalist (born 1982)

- Born: September 2, 1982 (age 44)
- Education: Harvard College
- Occupations: Writer; editor; executive producer
- Known for: The Toast

Nicole Cliffe (born September 2, 1982) is a Canadian writer living in Utah, who co-founded and co-edited the website The Toast with Daniel Lavery.

== Early life ==
Nicole Cliffe was born September 2, 1982, and grew up in Kingston, Ontario. A first-generation college student, she attended Harvard College on a full scholarship, studying English. She graduated in 2005. At Harvard, her friends included Amelia Lester, Matthew Yglesias, and Josh Barro.

== Career ==
=== Early career ===
Cliffe worked at a New York hedge fund before becoming a writer. She drew attention for a Tumblr entitled Lazy Self-Indulgent Book Reviews as well as a recurring book review column on The Awl called "Classic Trash". In June 2011, Cliffe joined the women's general interest site The Hairpin, where she became books editor. Through this work, Cliffe met future collaborator Daniel Lavery, first over the internet, then later in person.

=== The Toast ===
Cliffe and Lavery left The Hairpin in 2013 to found separate feminist general interest website The Toast, which Cliffe and Lavery co-edited, later adding Nicole Chung as managing editor and Jaya Saxena as a staff writer. Lawyer Nick Pavich was originally the publisher and one-third owner of the site, but departed in the winter of 2013–2014. Cliffe and her husband funded the site's launch. The Toast published from July 1, 2013, until July 1, 2016. From October 15, 2014, to September 2015, the project also included a sister site called The Butter; led by Roxane Gay, The Butter focused on personal essays and cultural criticism. The Toast made a one-day return with new material on July 26, 2017.

=== Writing and other projects ===
In addition to her editing and book reviews, Cliffe has drawn notice for her writing on a wide range of topics, including humor, collegiate financial aid, and Protestantism. She has written advice columns for Elle and Catapult's magazine, and in January 2018, became an advice columnist, with Carvell Wallace, at Slate. Their column, offering parenting advice, is called "Care and Feeding". She left Slate in 2020.

In December 2017, Cliffe joined the board of directors of Electric Literature.

In October 2019, Cliffe was credited as an executive producer for the documentary The Acid King, based on the non-fiction book of the same name about the life of Ricky Kasso.

== Personal life ==
Cliffe lives in Utah with her husband and three children. An atheist since college, she converted to Christianity in 2015. She is autistic, as is one of her children.
