= The Girl with the Jade Green Eyes =

1978 novel by John Boyd

- Cover
- Author: John Boyd
- Cover artist: Lynda West
- Language: English
- Genre: Science fiction
- Publication date: 1978
- Publication place: United States
- Media type: Print

The Girl with the Jade Green Eyes is a novel by John Boyd published in 1978.

== Plot summary ==
The Girl with the Jade Green Eyes is a novel about green aliens, a Naval examination center, and spies.

== Reception ==
C. Ben Ostrander reviewed The Girl with the Jade Green Eyes in The Space Gamer No. 17. Ostrander commented that the novel "is a fun little book [...] I did enjoy the two hours I spent reading it."

Kirkus Reviews states "Can this book really be as awful as it sounds? Yes, indeed. Boyd (author of the malodorous Barnard's Planet, 1975) writes with somewhat less poise and control than a busted cement mixer."

== Reviews ==
- Review by Stephen W. Potts (1979) in Science Fiction & Fantasy Book Review, March 1979
- Review by David Grigg (1979) in Australian SF News, March 1979
- Review by uncredited (1979) in Science Fiction: A Review of Speculative Literature, #4
- Review by Paul Kincaid (1979) in Vector 95
