= Jolie Kerr =

Writer and podcaster

Jolie Kerr (born 1976) is an American writer and podcast host. Her book, My Boyfriend Barfed in My Handbag...and Other Things You Can't Ask Martha, was a New York Times best-seller.

== Career ==
=== Ask A Clean Person ===
Kerr began her writing career in 2011 with a cleaning advice column on The Hairpin called "Ask a Clean Person." Her writing has since appeared on Jezebel, Deadspin, New York Magazine's Racked vertical and Esquire Magazine. Flavorwire described her as a "friendly, down-to-earth, judgement-free advice-giver."

=== My Boyfriend Barfed in My Handbag ===
In 2014, Kerr's book was published by Plume Books, a Penguin imprint. Writing for The New York Times, Dwight Garner called My Boyfriend Barfed "the Lorrie Moore short story, or the Tina Fey memoir, of cleaning tutorials...[a] wise and funny new book." At NPR Linda Holmes praised Kerr as "at her most irresistible when she's handling the kinds of awkward questions that do traditionally go unanswered in your women's magazines and your perky home-maintenance shows." The Huffington Post told readers: "This is going to sound like an oxymoron, but there is a genuinely amusing cleaning book out there. Really. I’m not kidding you."

=== Podcast ===
Kerr now hosts a podcast for Heritage Radio Network, also called Ask A Clean Person.
