= The Last Starship from Earth =

1968 novel by John Boyd

- Author: John Boyd
- Cover artist: Paul Lehr
- Language: English
- Genre: Science fiction
- Publisher: Weybright & Talley, New York
- Publication date: 1968
- Publication place: United States
- Media type: Print (Hardcover & Paperback)

The Last Starship from Earth is a 1968 science fiction novel by John Boyd, and is his best known novel.

== Setting ==
The novel is set in a dystopian society in the very near future. Although it is not obvious at first, this is also an alternate history story.

In this world, instead of preaching peace and forgiveness and being crucified, Jesus became a revolutionary agitator and assembled an army to overthrow the Roman Empire, establishing a theocracy before being killed by a crossbow, which becomes a religious symbol similar to the cross in our timeline. The regime established by Jesus continues to the present day, having dominated the entire world and mingled with scientific ideas and advanced technology, including a Church led by an AI pope.

Marriage and mating are related to genes, so there is a strong system of castes.

== Plot summary ==
The central character is Haldane IV, a mathematician who forms a caste-forbidden relationship with Helix, a poetess. He also becomes interested in investigating Fairweather, a famous mathematician who lived shortly before his time, and his son Fairweather II, whom he discovers led a failed rebellion.

Haldane and Helix are discovered and there is a show trial, which results in Haldane being exiled to "Hell" (a planet orbiting a distant star), where he meets Fairweather II and is reunited with Helix. It is revealed that Helix is Fairweather II's daughter; Fairweather II needed a mathematician for his time machine, and Helix was sent to Earth to engineer the exile of a mathematician to pilot an experimental time machine. Fairweather II makes Haldane immortal and sends him on a mission to go back in time and kill Jesus under his new name, "Judas Iscariot".

In an epilogue, we find Haldane in the present day. Instead of returning to the future in the time capsule, he had put Jesus in it, sending him to Helix in the future while he has lived his life out over the centuries as the eternally young wandering Jew, an action that reset the time line to the one we know; and he meets a girl on college campus who is similar to Helix.

== Trilogy ==
The book is supposedly the first in a trilogy. The other books appear to be The Pollinators of Eden, and The Rakehells of Heaven, although their stories show no obvious link to the world of The Last Starship.

== Critical response ==
Robert A. Heinlein said, "It belongs on the same shelf with 1984 and Brave New World," and the Los Angeles Times noted, "In the literate tradition of Huxley, Orwell, and Bradbury, it is a work of extraordinary impact." Joanna Russ, in her review of the book in 1969, was highly critical and wrote, "I forgive Mr. Boyd the anguish his novel caused me and hope he will eventually forgive me the anguish this review may cause him, but for Berkley there is no forgiveness. Only reform. Don't do it again."

Spider Robinson, however, praised the novel as "delightful, with a rigorously consistent internal logic that doesn't really become apparent until the very last chapter."
