= Nicole Chung =

American writer and editor (born 1981)

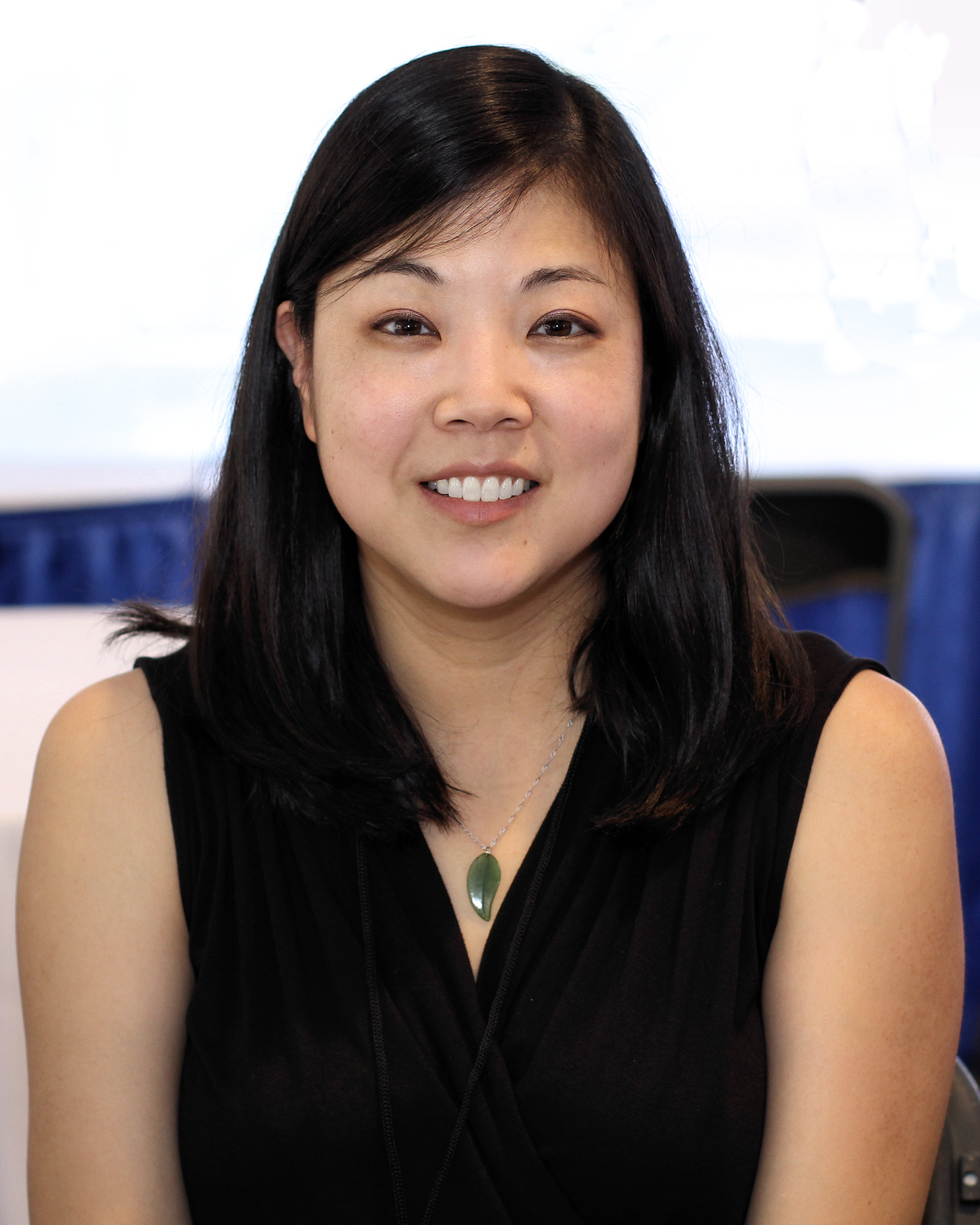
- Nicole Chung at the 2018 Texas Book Festival in Austin, Texas
- Born: May 5, 1981 (age 45); Seattle, Washington, U.S.
- Education: Johns Hopkins University
- Occupations: Writer, editor
- Children: 2
- Writing career
- Genres: Essay; memoir
- Notable work: All You Can Ever Know
- Website: nicolechung.net

- Nicole Chung
- Hangul: 정수정
- RR: Jeong Sujeong
- MR: Chŏng Sujŏng

Nicole Chung (born May 5, 1981) is an American writer and editor. She is the former managing editor of The Toast, the editor-in-chief of Catapult magazine, and the author of the memoirs All You Can Ever Know (2018) and A Living Remedy (2023).

== Early life and education ==
Chung was born in Seattle in 1981 to Korean parents who relinquished her to adoption after she spent months on life support. She was raised in Oregon by adoptive white Catholic parents. In her mid-20s Chung took a nonfiction class and started writing essays. She attended Johns Hopkins University, graduating with an undergraduate degree from the Krieger School of Arts and Sciences in 2003 and with an MA in 2014.

As of 2019, Chung lives in Washington, D.C., with her husband Dan and two daughters.

== Career ==
Chung worked as the managing editor for The Toast from 2014 until the site closed in 2016, after which she became the editor-in-chief of Catapult magazine. She continued writing essays on topics involving gender, race, and media, such as the impact of seeing Asian American figure skater Kristi Yamaguchi on television and experiencing casual racism at dinner parties.

=== All You Can Ever Know ===
Her first book, a memoir titled All You Can Ever Know, was published by Catapult in 2018. The memoir follows Chung's life story as well as the story of her birth sister, whom she met after reestablishing contact with their birth parents. The book is structured around Chung's experience during her first pregnancy of searching for her birth family, contacting them, and discovering a history of abuse, divorce, and deception.

Writing for The Washington Post, Bethanne Patrick called All You Can Ever Know "one of this year’s finest books", while Publishers Weekly called it "vibrant and provocative". Katy Waldman of The New Yorker praised the book's "relatability" but noted that the characters are "sympathetic, but not particularly enthralling" and that she wanted "more surprise, more invention, from this book". Kate Tuttle of The Boston Globe summarized the book as "deeply thoughtful and moving" and "a fiercely compelling page-turner".

=== A Living Remedy ===
Chung’s second memoir, A Living Remedy, was published in April 2023. It deals with the US healthcare system and the deaths of her parents.

== Works ==
- Chung, Nicole (2018). All You Can Ever Know. Catapult. ISBN 9781936787975.
- Chung, Nicole (2023). A Living Remedy: A Memoir. Ecco. ISBN 9780063031616.
