= If You Want to Walk on Water, You've Got to Get Out of the Boat =

Book by John Ortberg

- First edition cover
- Author: John Ortberg
- Language: English
- Subject: Jesus walking on water Leaps of faith
- Genre: Christian devotional literature
- Published: 2001 (Zondervan)
- Publication place: United States
- Pages: 224
- ISBN: 9780310228639
- OCLC: 673955
- Dewey Decimal: 248.4
- LC Class: BV4637 .O78 2003
- Preceded by: Grace
- Followed by: Love Beyond Reason
- Website: http://www.johnortberg.com/books/if-you-want-to-walk-on-water-youve-got-to-get-out-of-the-boat-participants-guide-with-dvd/

If You Want to Walk on Water, You've Got to Get Out of the Boat (also simply referred to as If You Want To Walk on Water) is a 2001 book written by John Ortberg that uses the New Testament account of Jesus walking on water as a conceptual framework for discussing leaps of faith and encouraging readers to make them. It became a bestseller. In March 2003, If You Want to Walk on Water was the third-best-selling religious book in Britain and the fourth-best-selling religious book in Scotland. In his book God Can't Sleep: Waiting for Daylight On Life's Dark Nights, Palmer Chinchen writes, that If You Want to Walk on Water is an "excellent book on faith". Religion News Service journalist Jonathan Merritt called the book a modern classic book. In 2002, If You Want to Walk on Water received the Christianity Today Book Award in the Christian Living category. Carol Rodman of The Commercial Appeal called the book "challenging". Willow Creek Community Church placed the book on its Essential Reading List. Mary Milla of St. Paul Pioneer Press said that If You Want to Walk on Water is "a must-read for anyone considering a career change ... It gives you the confidence you need to make a change, but without taking chances that wouldn't be the right fit for you".

== Bibliography ==
- Chinchen, Palmer (2011). God Can't Sleep: Waiting for Daylight On Life's Dark Nights. David C. Cook. ISBN 9781434704009.
- Ortberg, John (2001). If You Want to Walk on Water, You've Got to Get Out of the Boat. Zondervan. ISBN 9780310228639.
