= When It Was Dark =

1903 novel by Guy Thorne

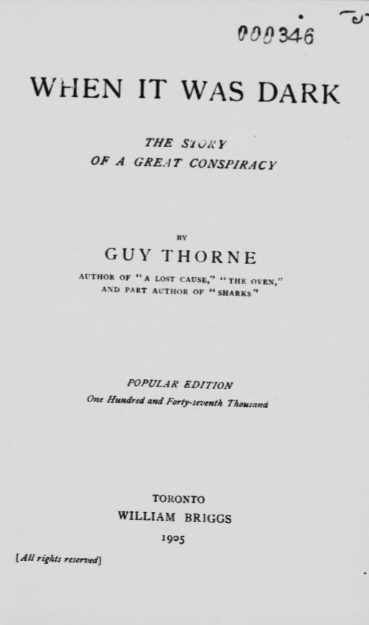
- Title page for When It Was Dark: The Story of a Great Conspiracy (1905)
- Author: Guy Thorne
- Language: English
- Subject: Religion
- Publisher: G.P. Putnam's Sons
- Publication date: 1903
- Publication place: England
- Pages: 412
- ISBN: 978-1-4373-6429-3
- Text: When It Was Dark at Wikisource

When It Was Dark: The Story of a Great Conspiracy (1903) is a best selling Christian novel by English author Guy Thorne, in which a plot to destroy Christianity by falsely disproving the Resurrection of Jesus leads to moral disorder and chaos in the world until it is exposed as a fraud.

The title is a reference to the bible verse John 20:1, "The first day of the week cometh Mary Magdalene early, when it was yet dark, unto the sepulchre, and seeth the stone taken away from the sepulchre." (King James Bible), which describes the account of Mary Magdalene witnessing the absence of Christ's body in the sepulchre.

== Plot synopsis ==
A wealthy and powerful English Jew, Constantine Schuabe, a known adversary of Christian clergy, plots to destroy Christianity by falsely disproving the resurrection of Jesus Christ. He exploits the financial situation of English Biblical expert Sir Robert Llewelyn, and coerces him to plant an inscription upon an ancient tomb entrance. This inscription, supposedly written by Joseph of Arimathea, stated that he took the body of Christ after his death and concealed it there. There ensues a decline in morality in the world before the plot is exposed, thereby postulating the state of a world without the religion of Christ.

== Reaction ==
After its publication, the Bishop of London preached about When It Was Dark at Westminster Abbey. Calling it "a remarkable work of fiction" he said it depicts how the world would be if the Resurrection were proved to be a gigantic fraud. ". . .you feel the darkness creeping round the world, you see . . . crime and violence increase in every part of the world. When you see how darkness settles down upon the human spirit, regarding the Christian record as a fable, then you quit with something like adequate thanksgiving, and thank God it is light because of the awful darkness when it was dark."

When It Was Dark has been criticised for its stereotyping of Jews and their portrayal as intent on destroying what Thorne viewed as the most valuable element of British life - the Christian faith and the spiritual values associated with it.

Christopher Hitchens called the book a "piece of trash novel which makes 'The Da Vinci Code' or the 'Left Behind' series seem like Proust or Balzac or George Eliot."

== Adaptation ==
In 1919 the novel was made into a silent film When It Was Dark directed by Arrigo Bocchi.

== See also ==
- The Gospel of Afranius (a work with the inverse idea - that the resurrection was a staging by the Romans)
