= John Boyd (author) =

American novelist (1919–2013)

John Boyd was the main literary name of Boyd Bradfield Upchurch (October 3, 1919 – June 8, 2013), an American science fiction author, born in Atlanta, Georgia. His best known work is his first science fiction novel, The Last Starship From Earth, published in 1968. Boyd wrote eleven science fiction novels, five other novels, and one biography. The majority of his novels were published by US publisher Weybright & Talley, with later ones appearing from science fiction publishers.

== Science fiction novels ==
- The Last Starship From Earth (1968, Weybright & Talley)
- The Pollinators of Eden (1969, Weybright & Talley. 1971, France: as La Planète Fleur, published by Denoël, series: Présence du Futur #140)
- The Rakehells of Heaven (1969) Weybright & Talley, Gollancz, Bantam, Pan, Penguin [Edition adds Preface]
- Sex and the High Command (1970) Weybright & Talley, Bantam
- The Organ Bank Farm (1970) Weybright & Talley, Bantam
- The Doomsday Gene (1972) Weybright & Talley
- The I. Q. Merchant (1972) Weybright & Talley
- The Gorgon Festival (1972) Weybright & Talley, Bantam
- Andromeda Gun (1974) Berkley Putnam, Berkley
- Barnard's Planet (1975) Berkley Putnam, Berkley
- The Girl with the Jade Green Eyes (1978) Viking, Penguin

== Other novels ==
- The Slave Stealer (as Boyd Upchurch) (1968, Weybright & Talley) historical novel set during the US slavery period.
- Scarborough Hall (1976) [as Boyd Upchurch] Berkley. Ghost story involving the slavery period.

== Short fiction ==
- "The Girl and the Dolphin" (Galaxy March–April 1973)

== Nonfiction books ==
- Behind Every Bush: Treason or Patriotism? (1979) [as Boyd Upchurch, with Representative Richard H Ichord]. Concerning the House Committee on Un-American Activities, of which Ichord served as chairman (1969–1975) after its change of name to the House Internal Security Committee.

== Nonfiction ==
- "What It Means To Write Science Fiction" (in Science Fiction: The Academic Awakening (ed. Willis E. McNelly) (College English Association, 1974)

== Definition of science fiction ==
Boyd has written about science fiction, giving a definition of the genre as "storytelling, usually imaginative as distinct from realistic fiction, which poses the effects of current or extrapolated scientific discoveries, or a single discovery, on the behavior of individuals [or] society."
