= John Ortberg =

American evangelical Christian author

- Born: May 5, 1957 (age 69); Rockford, Illinois, U.S.
- Occupations: Theologian, author, minister
- Spouse: Nancy
- Children: Laura Turner, Daniel M. Lavery, John Ortberg III
- Writing career
- Subjects: Leadership, theology
- Website: johnortberg.com

John Carl Ortberg Jr. (born May 5, 1957) is an American evangelical Christian author, speaker, and pastor. He served as the senior pastor of Menlo Church in Menlo Park, California, an ECO Presbyterian church with more than 4,000 members, for 17 years.

Ortberg has published many books; his 1997 The Life You've Always Wanted: Spiritual Disciplines for Ordinary People sold more than 500,000 copies as of 2008. Ortberg's 2002 If You Want to Walk on Water, You've Got to Get Out of the Boat was a Christianity Today Book Award winner, and the 2008 When the Game is Over, It All Goes Back in the Box was an ECPA Christian Book Award winner. Ortberg's Who Is This Man?: The Unpredictable Impact of the Inescapable Jesus (2012) debuted at #29 on Christian Book Expo's bestseller list in November 2012.

During the summer of 2020, Ortberg resigned as pastor of Menlo Church after an investigation disclosed that he had allowed his son, John III, to continue volunteer church work with minors after John III had disclosed having experienced unwanted thoughts of attraction to minors, allegations that had arisen in late 2019, initially without identifying the volunteer in question. Since his resignation, Ortberg has run a podcast offering daily Bible devotionals and speaks at Christian events.

== Early life and education ==
John Carl Ortberg, Jr. was born on May 5, 1957, in Rockford, Illinois. He earned his undergraduate degree from Wheaton College, and his M.Div. and Ph.D. in clinical psychology from Fuller Theological Seminary. Ortberg also studied at the University of Aberdeen, Scotland.

== Career ==
From 1985 to 1990, Ortberg served as senior pastor at Simi Valley Community Church, and then from 1990 to 1994 at Horizons Community Church (now Baseline Community Church) in Claremont, California. Ortberg then moved from California to Illinois to serve as a teaching pastor at Willow Creek Community Church in South Barrington, Illinois, until 2003, when he became the senior pastor at Menlo Park Presbyterian Church, a multi-campus church in Northern California.

=== Teachings ===
==== Spiritual formation ====
A central theme of Ortberg's teaching and books is spiritual formation, the transforming of human character through authentic experiences with God. Ortberg argues that the desire for comfort and security often stands in the way of an authentic relationship with God – when people place too high a value on being secure and comfortable they may be reluctant to make the sacrifices God asks of them.

==== Eternal cravings ====
Ortberg has warned against the societal pressures which tell people that bigger is always better, saying, "I think for all of us, whatever your ministry or job, bigness will never satisfy the call." In his books, Ortberg has described his own desire for importance and success, and how achieving them did not ultimately bring him happiness. "Your cravings," according to Ortberg, "if you could get to the bottom of them, are for the eternal."

=== Speaking and media ===
Ortberg has been a featured speaker at many events, including:

- Promise Keepers 2006 Conferences
- Westmont College (2007 commencement speaker)

Ortberg's retelling of his experience of playing Monopoly with his grandmother was used as the beginning narration of Peter Joseph's 2011 documentary Zeitgeist: Moving Forward.

== Personal life ==
Ortberg and his wife, Nancy, have three children: Laura Turner, Daniel Lavery, and John III. Nancy is a former healthcare administrator and leadership consultant. She has also written several published works (including the 2015 Seeing in the Dark: Finding God’s Light in the Most Unexpected Places), and has been a church teaching pastor and board member (e.g., at Willow Creek).

Laura has written for The New York Times, New York Magazine, and BuzzFeed. Daniel authored the "Dear Prudence" advice column for the Slate from 2015 to 2021, and founded, wrote, and edited the feminist humor blog The Toast, now defunct. Their youngest, John III, known as Johnny, was an Ultimate Frisbee coach until late 2019.

== Menlo Church departure ==
During the summer of 2018, Ortberg's son, John III, confessed to him that he was sexually attracted to minors. At that time, Ortberg did nothing to ensure that his son stopped his volunteer activities with minors at Menlo Church. Ortberg also did not alert other church leaders to the situation.

In 2020, Ortberg's other son, Daniel Lavery, posted on Twitter that a member of his father's church had disclosed his "obsessive sexual feelings about young children" to Lavery on November 15, 2019. Upon discovering that his father had not shared this information with Menlo Church Leadership or the Elder Board, Lavery went to the church's leadership himself. Exactly a week later on November 22, Ortberg went on leave from his position. The reason for his leave was not stated at that time.

On January 21, 2020, Menlo Church issued a statement indicating the reason why Ortberg was placed on leave: he had allowed a church volunteer (John III was not named in that statement) to work with children despite that volunteer's confession of a lifelong sexual attraction to children. Ortberg was reinstated after an investigation found no evidence of wrongdoing. Three days later, Ortberg returned from leave. He stated that he "failed to do the right thing" and apologized for his "lack of transparency". After completing a restoration plan, Ortberg returned to the pulpit on March 7.

Lavery alleged that this investigation was inadequate, because the lawyer who conducted it had no experience with matters of sexual misconduct, but rather was a specialist in protecting clients from litigation.

On July 29, 2020, Menlo Church announced that Ortberg had resigned from his position, effective August 2, citing broken trust and fallout from the “poor judgement” in decisions he had made in allowing his son to continue to volunteer with students after his confession of an attraction to minors.

In October 2021, the third-party organization Zero Abuse Project completed an investigation into the matter after interviewing 104 witnesses and reviewing or analyzing more than 500,000 documents. Zero Abuse Project did not find any disclosure or other evidence that Ortberg III committed any acts of wrongdoing against a minor.

== Published works ==
- Grace: An Invitation to a Way of Life (with Laurie Pederson and Judson Poling). Zondervan, 2000 ISBN 978-0-310-22074-9
- If You Want to Walk on Water, You've Got to Get Out of the Boat. Zondervan, 2001 ISBN 978-0-310-22863-9
- Love Beyond Reason. Zondervan, 2001 ISBN 978-0-310-23449-4
- The Life You've Always Wanted. Zondervan, 2002 ISBN 978-0-310-24695-4
- Everybody's Normal Till You Get To Know Them. Zondervan, 2003 ISBN 978-0-310-22864-6
- Living the God Life: Finding God's Extraordinary Love in Your Ordinary Life. Inspirio, 2004, ISBN 978-0-310-80195-5
- God Is Closer Than You Think: If God is Always with Us, why is He So Hard to Find? Zondervan, 2005 ISBN 978-0-310-25349-5
- Now What?: God's Guide to Life for Graduates. Zondervan, 2005 ISBN 978-0-310-80282-2
- When the Game Is Over, It All Goes Back in the Box. Zondervan, 2007 ISBN 978-0-310-25350-1
- Know Doubt. Zondervan, 2008 ISBN 978-0-310-32503-1
- The Me I Want To Be: Becoming God's Best Version of You. Zondervan, 2010 ISBN 978-0-310-27592-3
- Ortberg, John (August 2012). Who Is This Man?: The Unpredictable Impact of the Inescapable Jesus. New York, NY: HarperChristian. ISBN 9780310413448.
- Soul Keeping: Caring For the Most Important Part of You. Zondervan, 2014 ISBN 978-0-310-27596-1
- The foreword for Vanderbloemen, William (2014). Next: Pastoral Succession That Works. Baker. ISBN 978-0801016479.
- Eternity is Now In Session: A radical rediscovery of what Jesus really taught about salvation, eternity, and getting to the Good Place. Tyndale, 2018 ISBN 978-1-4964-3164-6
- Parables
- Life Changing Love
- Union with Christ
- Acts
- Water-Walking
- All the Places to Go …
- Faith and Doubt
- What is God’s will for my life?
- Love beyond reason
- How do I know if I’m really saved?
- Giving (with Laurie Pederson and Judson Poling)
- Grace (with Laurie Pederson and Judson Poling)
- Growth (with Laurie Pederson and Judson Poling)
- An ordinary day with Jesus (with Ruth Haley Barton)
- Insurmountable
