= Biblical speculative fiction =

Biblical speculative fiction is speculative fiction that uses Christian themes and incorporates the Christian worldview. (It is thus distinct from speculations on the Bible and/or Christianity such as Pilgrim's Progress, The Shack, or The Da Vinci Code.) The difference between biblical speculative fiction and general Christian speculative fiction is that the Christian nature of the story is overt. This represents the tension in the Christian fiction community between those who prefer stories that reflect a Christian worldview without explicitly Christian references (such as The Lord of the Rings), and those who prefer the more overt Christian material usually found in the works of G. K. Chesterton and C.S. Lewis. Examples of these views may be found in the explanatory page of Ray Gun Revival (2006–2012), a magazine that took the non-explicit route, and the homepage of the Lost Genre Guild, a group dedicated to explicitly Christian speculative fiction.

== Development ==
Modern biblical speculative fiction may be divided into two phases, though to some extent this reflects American Evangelical tendencies, not those of the world in general.

The first phase is a science-adventure story where the characters are generally devout Christians. They act on guidance from God, but no overt or miraculous divine intervention occurs. Like many other early Evangelical novels, there is almost always a non-Christian character who eventually becomes born again as a result of a formulaic process for getting saved. The emphasis is biblical and doctrinal. Theoretically, one could strip out the Christian content and simply get a moral, ethical science-fiction story, though some characters' motivations would be affected. An example of this phase is Bernard Palmer's Jim Dunlap series from the late 1960s, which was almost a Christian answer to Tom Swift, Jr.: Dr. Brockton, a godly former missionary, becomes a brilliant scientist, winning his young associates (including Jim Dunlap) to Christ as he produces various high-tech marvels, such as the wingless plane and a space station.

The second phase can almost be summed up in a single name: Frank Peretti. These stories still have a biblical and doctrinal emphasis, but they also feature miraculous intervention. Unlike the first type mentioned above, they are inherently Christian and would implode if the Christian content were removed. The salvation formula is not rigidly followed: a character's salvation experience is often more of a process than a formula-based event.

The importance of Peretti is likely that he showed other writers what was possible: This Present Darkness unapologetically featured demons, angels, and a non-human perspective on spiritual warfare. Much modern biblical speculative fiction derives from Peretti's approach or at least responds to it.

On the other hand, writers outside the American Evangelical community have produced some "modern" works for decades. G. K. Chesterton's The Ball and the Cross, for example, has a science-fictional opening critical of evolution, provides a salvation without the usual "sinner's prayer", and toward the end features a miraculous divine intervention seen in today's works. Likewise, C.S. Lewis' The Chronicles of Narnia are non-formulaic in their approach to salvation and overtly miraculous in content. The same is true of Lewis' Space Trilogy.

== Genres ==
Christian speculative fiction can come under a number of genres including;

- Fantasy (such as The Girl Who Could See by Kara Swanson)
- Steampunk (such as Tainted by Morgan Busse)
- Time Travel (such as A Wrinkle in Time by Madeleine L’Engle)
- Space travel (such as The Sparrow by Mary Doria Russell or Brand of Light by Ronie Kendig)
- Alien Invasion (such as the movie Signs)
- Supernatural (such as Soul’s Gate by James Rubart)
- Magic (such as Romanov by Nadine Brandes)
- Horror (such as Demon by Tosca Lee)
- End of the World (such as Lord of the World by Robert Hugh Benson or The Christ Clone Trilogy by James Beauseigneur)
- Possible futures (such as The Second Sleep by Robert Harris)
- Fictionalised history (such as the Homecoming Saga by Orson Scott Card or The Last Pilgrims by Michael Bunker)

== Current venues ==
In the last few years, many new venues have opened for the biblical, or Christian, speculative fiction genre. Jeff Gerke's Marcher Lord Press is one such example. Marcher Lord Press, using print-on-demand (POD) technology, is an independent publishing house for Christian speculative fiction and has made a name for itself within the Christian publishing industry. Other independent publishers have since followed this model such as Odyssey Illustrated Press, for instance, which came on the industry scene following encouragement from Gerke. The result has brought a broader range of Christian speculative fiction to this niche market, but has also answered the demand for more variety in the genre as well.

In addition, there are several Internet-only venues referred to as e-zines or web-zines. These include Mind Flights, Residential Aliens, and The Cross and the Cosmos. These venues offer free Christian speculative fiction for the masses and enable the propagation of the genre. They include a variety of downloadable content, stories, and poetry.

== The future ==
A different view of the subgenre's development suggests that there is a trend toward increasing inclusion, just as evangelical Protestants in general seem to be opening up to other branches of Christianity. This view is based on stories from a recent anthology, Light at the Edge of Darkness, and on cooperation in the field in general, such as promotion of non-Protestant works by Protestant writers, and vice versa. Odyssey Illustrated Press uses the model of distribution precedented by Marcher Lord Press, but publishes Christian speculative fiction that is more progressive in its approach to plot themes and character development. They are open to Christian readers and non-Christian readers alike. This approach is becoming more commonplace and is developing a new wave of Christian Speculative Fiction not unlike the movement in secular speculative fiction in the 1960s, helmed by writers such as Michael Moorcock.

== See also ==
- Christian science fiction
