= Guy Thorne =

English journalist and novelist (1876–1923)

Guy Thorne was the pen name of Cyril Arthur Edward Ranger Gull (1875 – 9 January 1923), a prolific English journalist and novelist best known for his novel When It Was Dark: The Story of A Great Conspiracy (1903). He also wrote under the names C. Ranger Gull and Leonard Cresswell Ingleby.

== Life and works ==
Thorne was educated at Denstone College, Manchester Grammar, and Oxford University, although he left without taking a degree. He was on the literary staff of the Saturday Review 1897–98, writing also for The Bookman and The Academy. He was editor of London Life in 1899, then joined the Daily Mail and later the Daily Express. He also wrote for the gossip weekly Society.

His first novel was The Hypocrite: A Novel of Oxford and London Life, published anonymously in 1898. From 1900, he was engaged in writing fiction, producing about 125 novels in the succeeding years. The most famous was When It Was Dark, which reached sales of 500,000 copies. The book describes the attempt by a Jew, the malevolent Constantine Schaube, to overthrow the whole of the Christian world by fraudulently disproving the Resurrection.

After its publication, the Bishop of London preached about When It Was Dark at Westminster Abbey. Calling it "a remarkable work of fiction" he said it depicts how the world would be if the Resurrection were proved to be a gigantic fraud. ". . .you feel the darkness creeping round the world, you see . . . crime and violence increase in every part of the world. When you see how darkness settles down upon the human spirit, regarding the Christian record as a fable, then you quit with something like adequate thanksgiving, and thank God it is light because of the awful darkness when it was dark."

When It Was Dark has been criticised for its stereotyping of Jews and their portrayal as intent on destroying what Thorne viewed as the most valuable element of British life – the Christian faith and the spiritual values associated with it. Other critics have also labelled the book as anti-Semitic.

A sequel When It Was Light (1906), often attributed to Gull, was probably written by George Reginald Bacchus.

Thorne was a prolific author of horror and mystery novels which sometimes have a redeeming bizarreness. His novels include: Made in His Image (1906), The Soul-Stealer (1906), The Angel (1908), Not in Israel (dedicated to Cecil Broadhurst, 1913), And it Came to Pass (1915), The Secret Sea-Plane (1915), The Enemies of England (1915), Lucky Mr Loder (1918), The Secret Monitor (1918), The Air Pirate (1919), Doris Moore (1919), The House of Danger (1920), The City in the Clouds (1921), The Love Hater (1921), The Dark Dominion (1923) and When the World Reeled (1924). He also wrote numerous essays and a biography of Frederick Nicholas Charrington (1850–1936), the English social reformer who devoted his life to Temperance work.

Thorne was a close friend of the publisher Leonard Smithers and a friend of the poet Ernest Dowson. He was known for his heavy drinking. Who's Who 1906 listed his recreations as shooting and French literature, and his address as Trink, Lelant, Cornwall.

Guy Thorne died in London on 9 January 1923.

A biography, Guy Thorne: C Ranger Gull: Edwardian Tabloid Novelist and his Unseemly Brotherhood, by David Wilkinson was published by Rivendale Press, High Wycombe in 2012.

== Works ==
The following is a partial list of works by Guy Thorne:

- When It Was Dark: The Story of a Great Conspiracy, 1904
- A Lost Cause, 1905
- The Soul Stealer, 1906
- The Serf, 1907
- "I Believe" and other essays, 1907
- The Angel, 1908
- The Socialist, 1909
- House of Torment, 1911
- The Drunkard, 1912
- The Great Acceptance: The Life Story of F. N. Charrington, 1913
- Chance in Chains: A Story of Monte Carlo, 1914
- The Secret Service Submarine: A Story of the Present War, 1915
- Rescuing Rupert , 1917
- The Air Pirate, 1919
- Lapse of the Bishop, 1920
- The City in the Clouds, 1922

=== as C. Ranger-Gull ===
- The Hypocrite, 1898
- Miss Malevolent, 1899
- Back To Lilac Land: A Theatrical Novel, 1902
- The Adventures of Ulysses the Wanderer: An Old Story, 1902
- A Story of the Stage, 1902
- The Price of Pity, 1905
- The Harvest of Love, 1905
- Portalone, 1908
- Retribution, reissued as a Daily Mail sixpenny novel no. 116 in 1910, illustrated by G. H. Evison.

=== as Leonard Cresswell Ingleby ===
- Oscar Wilde, 1907
- Oscar Wilde: Some Reminiscences, 1912
