= Facebook Instant Articles =

Feature of the social networking website Facebook

Facebook Instant Articles was a feature from social networking company Facebook for use with collaborating news and content publishers, that the publisher could choose to use for articles they select. When a publisher selected an article for Instant Articles, people browsing Facebook in its mobile app could see the entire article within Facebook's app, with formatting very similar to that on the publisher's website.

== History ==
=== Prior to launch ===
Facebook initially approached selected publishers with the idea of Instant Articles, so as to get early feedback that would allow Facebook to build a product that meets publisher needs.

According to a BuzzFeed spokesperson, BuzzFeed VP of Product Chris Johansen told Facebook that they needed seven things in order to participate in the program, including compatibility with comScore, Google Analytics, and BuzzFeed tracking tools, preservation of key aspects of the look, feel, and functionality of the website, and monetization. In January, Facebook returned for talks, saying they had implemented all of the requests.

=== Launch (May–June 2015) ===
Instant Articles launched officially on May 12, 2015. Launch partners included Woven Digital, BuzzFeed, The New York Times, National Geographic, The Atlantic, NBC News, The Guardian, BBC News, Bild, and Spiegel Online. Facebook also created an Instant Articles landing page to showcase Instant Articles in reverse chronological order. It was initially available only on Facebook's iPhone app.

Despite the huge amount of initial media attention paid to Instant Articles, no Instant Articles were published for three weeks following May 13, as noted in Business Insider. The Wall Street Journal noted that the pace of publication of Instant Articles was expected to rise significantly in June. On June 9, an Instant Article from The Guardian was published.

=== Monetization, greater compatibility with other tools, and global rollout (March–April 2016) ===
In late March 2016, Facebook announced that native ads and video ads would soon be allowed in Instant Articles.

In April 2016, Facebook Instant Articles became usable along with Medium and other publishing tools.

At the 2016 Facebook F8 conference, Facebook announced that Facebook Instant Articles would now be available to all publishers.

=== Decline & discontinuation (2017–2023) ===
By 2017, major publishers had begun disengaging from the service, with The Guardian and The New York Times pulling out.

Meta announced in October 2022 that they would end Instant Articles in April 2023, citing decreased user interest in news and rising interest in short-form video.

== Features ==
=== Analytics ===
At launch time, Facebook announced that Instant Articles would be compatible with comScore, Google Analytics, and Omniture, as well as many publishers' internal tracking tools. In addition, Facebook would offer publishers its own rich analytics on user behavior on Instant Articles.

=== Formatting ===
Facebook promised to preserve the look and feel of articles from the publisher's website when showing them as Instant Articles, but making them more minimalistic and also better suited to the user's device.

=== Advertising ===
Facebook allows ads to appear inside Instant Articles. Publishers can keep 100% of the revenue if they sell the ads, and Facebook gets its standard 30% cut if it sells the ads.

With the launch of Instant Articles, Facebook provided guidelines regarding the ad formats supported by Instant Articles. One of the constraints was that no ads can appear above the fold (so that when somebody first opens an Instant Article, they will not see an ad). This would help with rapid initial loading of pages.

In late March 2016, Facebook announced an expansion in the permissible ad formats. In particular, support for native ads as well as video ads was announced.

=== Load time ===
Facebook claimed that Instant Articles load ten times as fast as mobile web content, thereby creating a better user experience.

The Wall Street Journal reported that, according to tests done by Catchpoint Systems, Facebook's claim held true: the average load time for Instant Articles was between 0 and 300 milliseconds, compared with 3.66 seconds for similar articles on news publishers' websites. The difference was attributed to Facebook pre-loading articles as well as to Facebook allowing ads to be fetched without disrupting access to the content itself.

=== No special treatment in News Feed ===
Facebook claimed that Instant Articles would not receive ipso facto special treatment in user's News Feeds. However, commentators noted that, due to the faster load times, people might engage more with Instant Articles, and this might in turn increase their visibility in users' feeds, implicitly pressing publishers to start using Instant Articles.

== Reception ==
=== Reception by initial launch partners ===
BuzzFeed staff, who provided Facebook an initial list of requirements that Facebook needed to meet before they would try Instant Articles, praised Facebook's attitude, saying of the process: "It has felt extremely collaborative from the beginning."

James Bennet, editor-in-chief of The Atlantic, said he feared that publishing pieces through instant articles meant losing control of the means of distribution, but on the other hand, "we're trying to get out stories to as many people as possible, and at the same time, continue to build a core, loyal, enthusiastic audience." Bennet said The Atlantic was going into the deal cautiously, well aware that Facebook might later change the terms to ones less favorable to publishers.

=== Comments by others ===
A speed test by Catchpoint Systems, reported in The Wall Street Journal, confirmed Facebook's claims of Instant Articles loading ten times faster than mobile web articles.

The jengu group said that this Facebook feature is only for Facebook app users. Once Instant Articles is enabled on your Facebook page, Facebook will post all your news and articles as Instant Articles.

TechCrunch noted that, even if Facebook's terms for publishers were favorable at present, there was no guarantee that Facebook would continue to maintain these terms. It also noted that, if users engaged more with Instant Articles, this would cause them to be shown more often in users' feeds, implicitly forcing publishers to participate.

Vivian Schiller, a former executive at NBC, The New York Times, and Twitter, said that Facebook Instant Articles was too massive to ignore, as that's where the audience was.

Writing for The Awl, John Herrman identified some potential hazards of Facebook Instant Articles, and wrote that Facebook Instant Articles would make Facebook the default host for large portions of people's article-reading on mobile devices. This gave Facebook a lot of power and the company deserved closer scrutiny, just as Uber's position of immense power made it a legitimate target for scrutiny and criticism.

Writing for PandoDaily, David Holmes wrote that, even though he didn't expect Facebook Instant Articles to have immediate negative effects on online news publishing (largely because Facebook's rollout would be gradual), there were still concerns about Facebook becoming too powerful and using its position of power to strong-arm publishers at a later stage.
