= The Truce at Bakura =

1993 novel by Kathy Tyers

Truce at Bakura
- Author: Kathy Tyers
- Language: English
- Series: Canon C
- Genre: Science fiction
- Publisher: Bantam Spectra
- Publication date: Hardcover: 1 December 1993; Paperback: 1 November 1994
- Publication place: United States
- Media type: Print (hardcover & paperback)
- Pages: Hardcover: 311; Paperback: 341
- ISBN: 0-517-15480-3 (hardcover); 0-553-56872-8 (paperback)
- Preceded by: Return of the Jedi
- Followed by: The Glove of Darth Vader

The Truce at Bakura is a 1993 Star Wars spin-off novel by Kathy Tyers. It takes place immediately after the events depicted in the film Return of the Jedi (1983) and before those of the young-reader series Jedi Prince (1992–1993).

The book was later adapted as an audiobook, which is read by Anthony Heald. Galoob released models of ships and characters from the novel as part of its Micro Machines line.

== Plot summary ==
While recovering from their victory against the Empire at Endor, the Rebel Alliance intercepts an Imperial probe containing a distress call for the Emperor. The message details a lizardlike race of aliens invading the Outer Rim planet Bakura. With Palpatine dead and the Imperial Navy scattered, Luke Skywalker volunteers to lead a force to intercept the alien invasion and save Bakura.

Upon arrival, the Rebel Alliance's force has no choice but to ally with the remnants of the Imperial garrison to repel an invasion by the reptilian Ssi-Ruuk race under the Ssi-ruuvi Imperium, which seeks to establish a beachhead in the larger galaxy. The Ssi-Ruuk seek to harvest a supply of life forms, whose life energies power their advanced technology through a process known as "entechment". Luke especially intrigues the Ssi-Ruuk, because they believe his Force powers could allow the Ssi-ruuk to "entech" beings from a distance. Obi-Wan Kenobi appears to Luke and alerts him to the danger of the Ssi-Ruuk if they get into the greater galaxy with this technology. The Ssi-ruuk themselves cannot sense the Force, but they know of it through a captured human, Dev Sibwarra, who is Force-sensitive but untrained (his mother was killed by the Ssi-ruuk) and has been brainwashed into furthering the Ssi-ruuvi agenda.

On a personal level, Luke finds himself consistently distracted by one of Bakura's senators, Gaeriel Captison, and by the nascent attraction forming between them, despite her religious objections to the Jedi Order. Princess Leia and Han Solo also struggle to find some time together and hash out their newly formed relationship. Leia, putting diplomatic feelers out into a world that 'joined' the Empire only three years before, discovers that Bakura chafes under Imperial rule—as do some of the Imperials, notably ranking officer Commander Pter Thanas—though Imperial governor Wilek Nereus is too crafty to let dissension spread too far. Finally, Leia must find a way to cope with the revelation given to her on Endor—that Darth Vader is actually her father, Anakin Skywalker—when she is visited by his spirit, who begs for her forgiveness.

In the end, Nereus attempts to turn Luke over to the Ssi-ruuk in exchange for their retreat, but though the kidnapping succeeds, Luke manages to fight them off and escape. He is also able to free Dev of his brainwashing and decides to take him on as an apprentice, but Dev is injured during the escape and later dies of his wounds. The joint Rebel-Imperial force turns back the Ssi-ruuk, and during the chaos, Bakuran resistance cells overthrow Nereus; in his absence, Bakura decides to join the Rebel Alliance. Commander Thanas defects as well, although he first destroys the Rebel cruiser-carrier Flurry. New Republic Intelligence later referred to the battle as the "Bakura Incident", and believed that it would be best if the New Republic attempted to prevent widespread public knowledge of the Ssi-Ruuk, advice that was taken controversially at best. In addition, Luke finally makes his breakthrough with Gaeriel, though he must shortly leave her when the Alliance forces depart at the end of the novel, to continue the ongoing fight against the Empire.

== Characters ==
- Gaeriel Captison
- Wilek Nereus
- Princess Leia Organa
- Dev Sibwarra
- Obi-Wan Kenobi
- Anakin Skywalker
- Luke Skywalker
- Han Solo
- Pter Thanas
- Wedge Antilles
- R2-D2
- C-3PO

== Role in greater Star Wars continuity ==
While most existing spin-off works were excluded from the Star Wars canon in 2014, five years later, Bakura appeared in the first episode of Vader Immortal: A Star Wars VR Series, and was mentioned in the Star Wars Resistance episode "Rendezvous Point".

== Reviews ==
The book received several reviews, including:

- Mort, John (1993-10-15), "Star Wars: The Truce at Bakura", Booklist, v90 (n4), American Library Association: 395, ISSN 0006-7385
- LaFaille, Gene (1994-02-01), "The Truce at Bakura.(Young Adult Review)(Brief Article)", Wilson Library Bulletin, 68 (6), H.W. Wilson Co: 70–71, ISSN 0043-5651
- "The Truce at Bakura.(Book Review)(Brief Article)", Library Journal, 118, Library Journals, LLC: 180, 1993-12-01, ISSN 0363-0277
- "The Truce at Bakura.(Book Review)(Brief Article)", Publishers Weekly, 240 (41), PWxyz, LLC: 74, 1993-10-11, ISSN 0000-0019 – via Gale
