= The Pollinators of Eden =

1969 novel by John Boyd

- First edition
- Author: John Boyd
- Cover artist: Paul Lehr
- Language: English
- Genre: Science fiction
- Publisher: Weybright & Talley, New York
- Publication date: 1969
- Publication place: United States
- Media type: Print (hardback & paperback)
- Pages: 212
- OCLC: 23671

The Pollinators of Eden is the second science fiction novel by John Boyd, originally published in hardcover by Weybright & Talley in 1969. Dell Books issued a paperback version in 1970. The Science Fiction Book Club issued the novel twice, in 1969 and 1972. Gollancz published the British hardcover in 1970, with paperbacks following from Pan Books in 1972. Penguin Books issued an international paperback edition in 1978. A French translation, La planète fleur, appeared in 1971, and a German rendering, Die Sirenen von Flora, in 1982.

The novel deals with botanical research into potentially intelligent, sexually voracious species of plants native to a newly discovered extrasolar planet.

== Reception ==
Lester del Rey praised Boyd for "rather sharp characterization and a much higher level of writing", but declared the novel a failure due to radical shifts at the conclusion, saying "The final twenty-two pages simply grind along somehow to an ending that means nothing emotionally." M. John Harrison (writing as "Joyce Churchill") panned Pollinators as "a feebler look at The Ring of Ritornel, replacing Harness's fast baroque attack with textbook botany and his joie de vivre with trite sexual observation and natty dialogue". Kirkus Reviews declared that "This hybrid has enough Freudian fertilizer to swamp any Eden" and called the novel "A sorry transplant indeed". P. Schuyler Miller, however, reviewed the novel positively, comparing it favorably to Philip Jose Farmer's work, saying "This book would be a treat for its picture of intra- and interagency intrigue alone. It gives you much, much more, enough to make it a worthy candidate for the next round of 'best novel' awards." Revisiting the novel on its 1978 reissue, Gerald Jonas wrote in The New York Times that "[A]ll is right along the way as well, thanks to Mr. Boyd's stylistic control and his knack for making even the most far-fetched plot device seem like a logical outgrowth of what has come before".
