= Kathy Tyers =

American author and musician (born 1952)

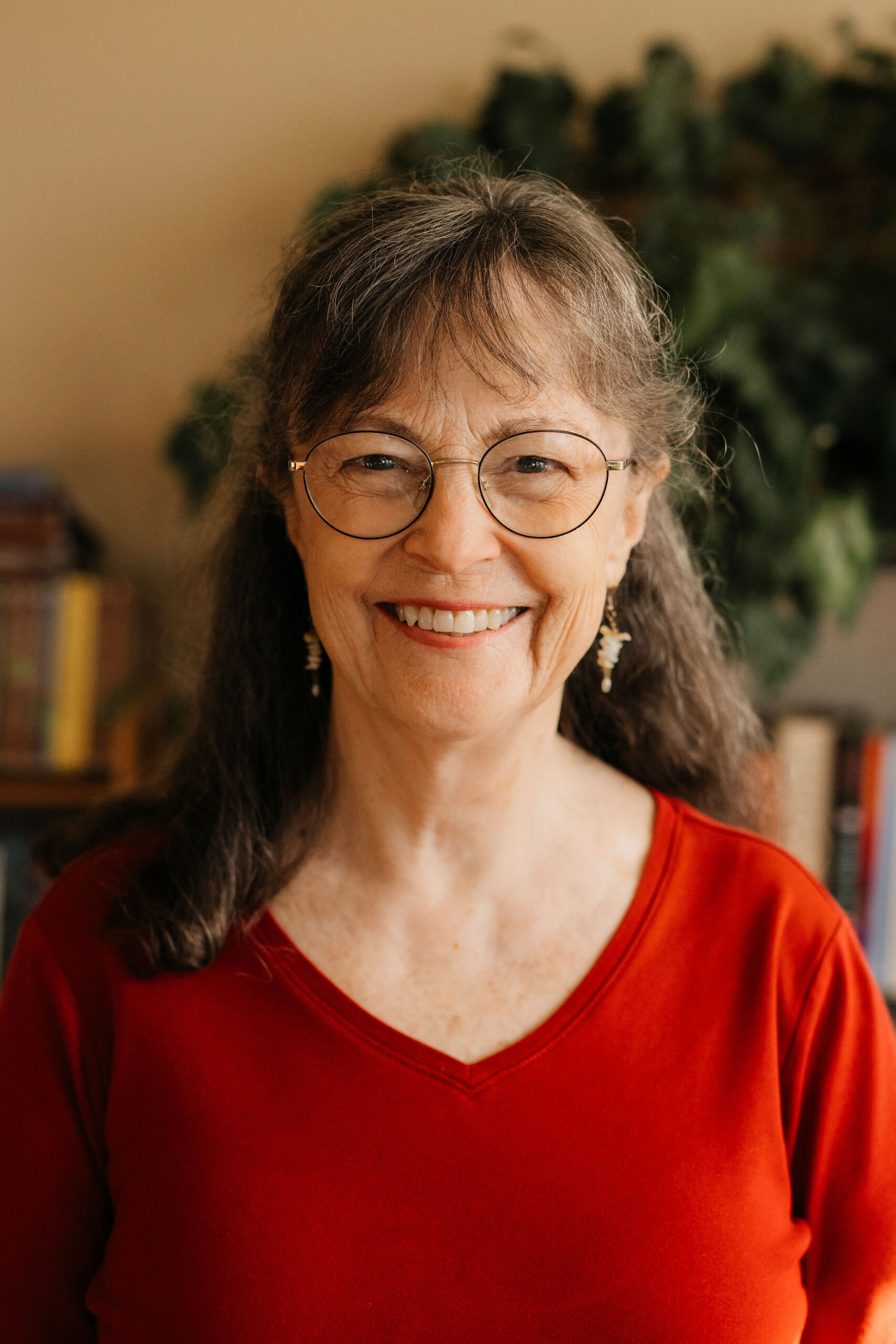
- Born: July 7, 1952 (age 74); Long Beach, California, U.S.
- Education: Montana State University, Regent College, Vancouver BC
- Writing career
- Genre: Science fiction

Kathy Tyers is an American science fiction author.

Tyers, born in Long Beach, California, is a microbiology graduate and a certified K-12 teacher. She began her writing career in the early 1980s, publishing her first novel, Firebird, in 1987. She continued to write successful science fiction novels, including The Truce at Bakura, which reached the New York Times bestseller list. After taking a sabbatical from writing, Tyers returned to the field, targeting the Christian Booksellers Association. The rewritten versions of Firebird and Fusion Fire, along with a third novel, Crown of Fire, were marketed as Christian fiction. Tyers continued to contribute to the Star Wars universe with an additional novel and several short stories. After her husband's death in 2004, she took another sabbatical, during which she worked on an autobiography and earned a Master of Christian Studies degree. The Firebird Saga has continued with three more novels, and Tyers remarried in 2014.

== Biography ==
Kathy Tyers Gillin (née Moore) was born and raised in Long Beach, California. She obtained a degree in microbiology from Montana State University, where she met her first husband, Mark Tyers. After their marriage, she returned to school and became certified to teach grades K-12. When their church opened a private school, she took over teaching the lower grades. In 1979, she retired from teaching to start a family. Her son Matthew was born in 1981, and she began writing in earnest two years later.

Tyers published her first novel, Firebird, with Bantam Spectra in 1987. She subsequently published Fusion Fire (1988; a sequel to Firebird), Crystal Witness (1989) and Shivering World (1991). During this period she also authored a nonfiction travel book and, with her husband, released two CDs of folk music, Leave Her, Johnny and The Very Best Dreams on which she played flute and Irish harp. In 1991, while working on another speculative fiction novel, she was approached with an opportunity to write a novel in the Star Wars Expanded Universe. Her novel, The Truce at Bakura (1993), reached the New York Times bestseller list.

Despite her success, after the sale of her novel, One Mind's Eye, Tyers took a complete sabbatical from writing from 1994 to 1997. She eventually returned to writing, specifically targeting the Christian Booksellers Association in an attempt to sell Christian science fiction, and Bethany House Publishers published rewritten versions of Firebird and Fusion Fire.

The rewritten versions, published in 1999 and 2000 along with a third novel, Crown of Fire, were more spiritual in nature and, in most markets, were marketed as Christian fiction instead of science fiction. They were published as a single volume edition in 2004. During the same period, Tyers was approached for the Star Wars market again and authored another novel, Balance Point, in addition to short stories for four Star Wars anthologies. Shivering World was revised and re-released in early 2004.

Tyers' husband, Mark, died from alcoholism in 2004. She took another sabbatical from fiction writing, working with guitarist Christopher Parkening on his autobiography Grace Like a River. In 2006, she entered Regent College in Vancouver, British Columbia, and after earning a Master of Christian Studies degree, she lived in Bellingham, Washington for a year before returning to Montana.

The three Firebird novels were re-released in an annotated version in 2011, followed by two additional series novels: Wind and Shadow in 2011 and Daystar in 2012. After recovering from long Covid, and encouraged by writing friends, she returned to the Firebird universe in 2025. FIREBREAK, the first novel in a new Firebird Interlude Trilogy, is a March 2026 release from Enclave Publishing, to be followed by two more books in 2027 and 2028.

Tyers remarried in 2014 and is part of the Presbyterian Church of America. (PCA)

== Bibliography ==
- Firebird (1987, revised 1999 and 2011)
- Fusion Fire (1988, revised 2000 and 2011)
- Crystal Witness (1989)
- Exploring the Northern Rockies (1991, travel)
- Shivering World (1991, revised 2004)
- The Truce at Bakura (1993) (Part of the Star Wars Legends fictional universe)
- "We Don't Do Weddings" in Tales from the Mos Eisley Cantina (1995) (Part of the Star Wars Legends fictional universe)
- "A Time to Mourn, A Time to Dance: Oola's Tale" in Tales from Jabba's Palace (1996) (Part of the Star Wars Legends fictional universe)
- "The Prize Pelt: Bossk's Tale" in Tales of the Bounty Hunters (1996) (Part of the Star Wars Legends fictional universe)
- One Mind's Eye (1996)
- "Tinian on Trial" in Tales from the Empire (1997) (Part of the Star Wars Legends fictional universe)
- Balance Point (2000) (Part of the Star Wars fictional universe)
- Crown of Fire (2000)
- Firebird: A Trilogy (2004)
- "Their New Masters" in Eat My Martian Dust, (2005)
- Grace Like a River (2006, biography)
- The Annotated Firebird (2011)
- Wind and Shadow (2011)
- Daystar (2012)

== Discography ==
- Leave Her, Johnny (1986)
- The Very Best Dreams (1988)
