= The Toast (website) =

2013–2016 feminist writing website

- Website type: Magazine; Feminist; Satire
- Editors: Daniel M. Lavery; Nicole Cliffe
- Website: www.the-toast.net
- Commercial: Yes
- Launched: 7 January 2013; 13 years ago
- Current status: Inactive

The Toast was an American anthology, humor and feminist writing website, founded by editors Nicole Cliffe and Daniel M. Lavery (né Ortberg) and publisher Nicholas Pavich. It was active from January 2013 through July 2016.

== Content and target audience ==
The website was known for its parodic reworkings of classic literature and art. Lavery has described its target market as 'librarians'. The Toast has also published on feminism, LGBTQIA+ experiences, and ethnicity-related topics, including a lengthy series on adoption. At the site's debut, Cliffe and Lavery described its "stance," noting that "We strive to be intersectionally feminist. We are pro-choice. We are pro-queer. We are pro-trans. We strive to feature writing from women of all ethnic backgrounds[.]" Its name originates from the toast of the British Royal Navy hoping for "a willing foe, and sea room", which was used as its slogan.

Lavery and Cliffe previously both wrote for The Hairpin, through which they met. Lavery's books, Texts from Jane Eyre and The Merry Spinster, are developments of his writing on The Toast. From October 15, 2014, to September 2015, the project also included a vertical called The Butter; led by Roxane Gay, The Butter focused on personal essays and cultural criticism.

== Closure ==
Co-founder Nicholas Pavich, who was credited as publisher, left the site in summer 2015. Lavery and Cliffe announced 13 May 2016 that they were "closing" the site as of 1 July 2016. They cited declining advertising revenues and the difficulties of managing the website alongside their writing careers. Lavery had previously commented that sustaining the rate of material needed to earn advertising revenue was difficult: "I generally write anywhere from 2-4 posts a day, and they're very rarely blog posts, it's almost all original fiction or humor or essays and a lot of our site's traffic is dependent on that. Luckily, I enjoy it, but it can also be creatively demanding, and if we have a slow day, it's kind of my fault and if I half-ass it, we look stupid and boring." The Toast website remained online after the closure, with infrequent updates, through 28 Jan 2018. The last published article was a publication announcement for Hey Ladies, a book inspired by a regular feature on the site.

The final contribution to the website before it ceased regular publication was a column by Hillary Clinton, in which she reflected on the blog's importance to female writers.

== Archiving by the Library of Congress ==
In January 2018, The Toast was selected by the Library of Congress for inclusion in its web archives. The completed archive consists of captures from September 19, 2013, to November 11, 2016.

== Notable contributors ==
Name	Role	Notes
Nicole Cliffe	Founder, Co-Editor, Writer	Work including "Link Roundup!" series
Daniel M. Lavery	Founder, Co-Editor, Writer	Work including "Texts from" series, "Children's Stories Made Horrific" series
Nicole Chung	Managing Editor (2014-2016), Writer	
Jaya Saxena	Staff Writer (2015-2016)	
Roxane Gay	Editor of The Butter (2014-2015), Writer	
Marco Seiferle-Valencia	Web Goth	
Gretchen McCulloch	Resident Linguist and Writer	
Emily V. Gordon	Contributing writer	
