= Chris Walley (writer) =

Welsh geologist (born 1954)

Chris Walley (born 1954) is a geologist, author, and college lecturer.

== Early life and education ==
Walley was born in Wales in 1954 and grew up in northern England. He received a Bachelor of Science in geology from Sheffield University and a Phd from the University of Wales, Swansea.
