= Menlo Church =

- 37.4493°N 122.1877°W
- Location: 950 Santa Cruz Ave, Menlo Park, California 94025
- Country: United States
- Denomination: ECO: A Covenant Order of Evangelical Presbyterians
- Website: menlo.church

History
- Founded: November 30, 1873

Menlo Church, previously Menlo Park Presbyterian Church, is a Presbyterian church congregation located in the San Francisco Bay Area with campuses in Menlo Park, Mountain View, San Mateo, and Saratoga, California.

== History ==
The church was officially organized on November 30, 1873. Its congregation has over 3,863 members as of 2016. It was listed as the 17th Most Influential Church in America according to a 2007 survey.

The original site was donated in 1874, less than a year after the church was founded, and MPPC met for 76 years at 700 Santa Cruz Avenue and Chestnut, until the church built its current facility at 950 Santa Cruz Avenue in 1950, where it remains now. The Open Doors campaign led to the openings of two new campuses: the North Campus in San Mateo and the South Campus in Mountain View, in 2007 and 2008. In 2015, the church renamed itself Menlo Church to unify the different campuses, and also launched the Menlo San Jose, Saratoga and South City campuses.

On March 2, 2014, the congregation voted to affirm the recommendation of the session to depart Presbyterian Church (U.S.A.) in order to realign with ECO: A Covenant Order of Evangelical Presbyterians denomination.

Menlo Church was formerly led by Senior Pastor John Ortberg Jr., a widely known evangelical author and speaker. Ortberg was placed on a temporary leave of absence in November 2019 after allowing a volunteer (later revealed to be his son), who had confessed a sexual attraction to minors, to continue volunteering with minors at the church. After an initial investigation by a third party, no evidence of wrongdoing was found. Ortberg returned to the pulpit on March 7, 2020. The church later announced his resignation on July 29, 2020, citing broken trust and “poor judgment” in the aforementioned decisions.

On October 27, 2020, Menlo Church named John Crosby as its Transitional Pastor. In March, 2021, the worship director of the Mountain View branch of the Menlo Church was fired after a claim was made of “inappropriate behavior online” many years ago. In November 2022, after a two-year nationwide search, Phil EuBank was confirmed by congregational vote to take on the responsibilities of Senior Pastor at Menlo Church.
