= The Hairpin =

Women's website in The Awl network

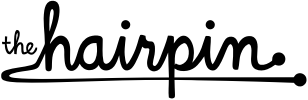
- Website type: Current events, culture
- Available in: English
- Dissolved: 2018; 8 years ago
- Creator: Edith Zimmerman
- Editor: Edith Zimmerman; Emma Carmichael; Haley Mlotek; Sylvia Killingsworth
- Key people: Michael Macher
- Website: thehairpin.com
- Launched: 2010; 16 years ago
- Current status: Content farm

The Hairpin was a women's writer-led website in The Awl network. It was founded in 2010 by Edith Zimmerman. It ceased publication at the end of January 2018.

From 2013 to 2014, The Hairpin was edited by Emma Carmichael, with Jia Tolentino as contributing editor. Haley Mlotek was editor at The Hairpin from 2014 to 2015, with Jazmine Hughes as contributing editor, followed by Alexandra Molotkow. The site went on hiatus briefly but was revived in 2016 when Sylvia Killingsworth left The New Yorker to become editor of both The Awl and The Hairpin.

Carmichael described her role as the first new editor at The Hairpin after Zimmerman stepped down in 2013 as "really hard; Edith created a perfectly formed product in The Hairpin and her voice was...The Hairpin".

The Hairpin had been home to several recurring features including Jia Tolentino's "Interview With a Virgin", Jolie Kerr's "Ask A Clean Person", former This American Life producer Jane Marie's makeup tutorial series "How To Be A Girl" and Lindsay King-Miller's advice column "Ask A Queer Chick".

== Discontinuation ==
Glen Weldon discussed the demise of The Hairpin as being in response to the decline in advertisement-driven website revenue, making a difficult situation for independent publishers. The URL and brand was resurrected with SEO-optimized AI-generated articles in 2024. Some articles remain, but the bylines have been replaced with generic male names. The new owner, a Serbian DJ named Nebojša Vujinović Vujo, bought the site because it had "great reputation and excellent backlinks." Vujo was able to buy the domain because the previous owners had let it lapse.

== See also ==
- Jezebel (website)
- Feminist blog
