= Berlin-Pankow (electoral district) =

Federal electoral district of Germany

75 Berlin-Pankow
- Electoral district for the Bundestag
- Berlin-Pankow in 2025
- State: Berlin
- Population: 329,800 (2019)
- Electorate: 235,647 (2021)
- Area: 96.7 km^{2}

Current electoral district
- Created: 2002
- Party: GRÜNE
- Member: Julia Schneider
- Elected: 2025

Berlin-Pankow is an electoral constituency (German: Wahlkreis) represented in the Bundestag. It elects one member via first-past-the-post voting. Under the current constituency numbering system, it is designated as constituency 75. It is located in northern Berlin, comprising the Pankow borough.

Berlin-Pankow was created for the 2002 federal election. Since 2025, it has been represented by Julia Schneider of the Alliance 90/The Greens.

== Geography ==
Berlin-Pankow is located in northern Berlin. As of the 2021 federal election, it comprises the Pankow borough excluding the area of Prenzlauer Berg east of Prenzlauer Allee.

== History ==
Berlin-Pankow was created in 2002 and contained parts of the abolished constituencies of Berlin Hohenschönhausen – Pankow – Weissensee and Berlin Mitte – Prenzlauer Berg. In the 2002 through 2009 elections, it was constituency 77 in the numbering system. In the 2013 through 2021 elections, it was number 76. From the 2025 election, it has been number 75. Its borders have not changed since its creation.

== Members ==
The constituency was first represented by Wolfgang Thierse of the Social Democratic Party (SPD) from 2002 to 2009. Stefan Liebich of The Left won the constituency in 2009, and was re-elected in 2013 and 2017. Stefan Gelbhaar won the constituency for the Greens in 2021, and was succeeded by fellow Green Julia Schneider in 2025.

Election	Member	Party	%
2002	Wolfgang Thierse	SPD	44.7
2005	Wolfgang Thierse	SPD	41.1
2009	Stefan Liebich	LINKE	28.8
2013	Stefan Liebich	LINKE	28.3
2017	Stefan Liebich	LINKE	28.8
2021	Stefan Gelbhaar	GRÜNE	25.5
2025	Julia Schneider	GRÜNE	25.8

== Election results ==
=== 2025 election ===
Federal election (2025): Berlin-Pankow
Notes:	Blue background denotes the winner of the electorate vote. Pink background denotes a candidate elected from their party list. Yellow background denotes an electorate win by a list member, or other incumbent. A ✓ or ✗ denotes status of any incumbent, win or lose respectively.						
Party	Candidate	Votes	%	±%	Party votes	%	±%
Greens	Julia Schneider	50,854	25.8	▼0.9	38,819	19.6	▼6.3
Left	Maximilian Schirmer	45,010	22.9	▲8.7	43,180	21.8	▲7.5
AfD	Ronald Gläser	33,179	16.9	▲2.7	31,087	15.7	▲1.2
CDU	Franziska Dezember	31,918	16.2	▼1.3	28,628	14.4	▼2.3
SPD	Alexandra Wend	26,106	13.3	▼2.7	26,046	13.1	▼1.9
BSW					15,126	7.6	New
FDP	Daniela Kluckert	5,407	2.7	▼0.3	6,555	3.3	▼0.4
Tierschutzpartei					2,779	1.4	▼1.5
Volt					2,235	1.1	▲0.4
PARTEI					1,573	0.8	▼1.4
FW	John Kucharski	2,357	1.2	▲0.4	762	0.4	▼0.4
PdF					371	0.2	New
BD	Gerhard Gruner	1,170	0.6	New	294	0.1	New
Team Todenhöfer					224	0.1	▼0.3
MERA25					201	0.1	New
BüSo	Stephan Ossenkopp	812	0.4	New	123	0.1	0.0
MLPD					83	0.1	0.0
SGP					54	0.1	0.0
Informal votes		2,259			932		
Total valid votes		196,813			198,140		
Turnout		199,072	84.6	▲26.4			
Greens hold	Majority	5,844	2.9	▼1.1			

=== 2021 election ===
Federal election (2021): Berlin-Pankow
Notes:	Blue background denotes the winner of the electorate vote. Pink background denotes a candidate elected from their party list. Yellow background denotes an electorate win by a list member, or other incumbent. A ✓ or ✗ denotes status of any incumbent, win or lose respectively.						
Party	Candidate	Votes	%	±%	Party votes	%	±%
Greens	Stefan Gelbhaar	46,401	25.5	▲11.3	48,131	26.4	▲12.1
SPD	Klaus Mindrup	39,131	21.5	▲5.1	40,174	22.0	▲6.4
Left	Udo Wolf	29,559	16.2	▼12.5	25,176	13.8	▼9.6
CDU	Manuela Anders-Granitzki	23,045	12.7	▼6.9	21,285	11.7	▼8.1
AfD	Götz Frömming	16,242	8.9	▼3.2	15,962	8.8	▼3.7
FDP	Daniela Kluckert	12,515	6.9	▲2.6	14,650	8.0	▲1.4
Tierschutzpartei	Elke Weihusen	4,915	2.7		4,280	2.3	▲1.0
PARTEI	Jannis Kiesewalter	4,317	2.4	▼0.7	3,272	1.8	▼0.7
Die Grauen					2,439	1.3	▲0.8
FW	Ilja Martin	2,146	1.2	▲0.5	1,882	1.0	▲0.7
Volt	Paul von Loeper	1,297	0.7		1,314	0.7	
Team Todenhöfer					699	0.4	
Gesundheitsforschung	Felix Werth	1,037	0.6		700	0.4	▲0.1
Pirates	Marianne Utz	960	0.5		699	0.4	▼0.1
Humanists					337	0.2	
DKP					292	0.2	0.0
ÖDP	Thomas Georg Kuhn	426	0.2	▼0.3	289	0.2	▼0.1
du.					231	0.1	0.0
NPD					163	0.1	
V-Partei3					126	0.1	▼0.1
LKR	Paul Daniel Seifert	115	0.1		108	0.1	
BüSo					64	0.0	0.0
MLPD					56	0.0	0.0
SGP					55	0.0	0.0
Informal votes		2,530			2,252		
Total valid votes		182,106			182,384		
Turnout		184,636	78.4	▼1.2			
Greens gain from Left	Majority	7,270	4.0				

=== 2017 election ===
Federal election (2017): Berlin-Pankow
Notes:	Blue background denotes the winner of the electorate vote. Pink background denotes a candidate elected from their party list. Yellow background denotes an electorate win by a list member, or other incumbent. A ✓ or ✗ denotes status of any incumbent, win or lose respectively.						
Party	Candidate	Votes	%	±%	Party votes	%	±%
Left	✓ Stefan Liebich	53,618	28.8	▲0.4	43,774	23.5	▼1.7
CDU	Gottfried Ludewig	36,429	19.6	▼4.4	36,994	19.8	▼3.7
SPD	Klaus Mindrup	30,509	16.4	▼4.6	29,185	15.6	▼6.4
Greens	Stefan Gelbhaar	26,376	14.2	▼0.6	26,651	14.3	▲0.2
AfD	Georg Pazderski	22,487	12.1	▲8.0	23,315	12.5	▲7.6
FDP	Daniela Kluckert	7,890	4.2	▲3.3	12,321	6.6	▲4.1
PARTEI	Christian Rall	5,810	3.1	▲1.8	4,613	2.5	▲1.3
Tierschutzpartei					2,477	1.3	
DiB					1,004	0.5	
Die Grauen					936	0.5	
Pirates					870	0.5	▼3.4
BGE					852	0.5	
FW	Clemens Herrmann	1,339	0.7	▲0.2	692	0.4	0.0
Gesundheitsforschung					537	0.3	
Independent	Thomas Schirm	454	0.2				
ÖDP	Thomas Kuhn	950	0.5		429	0.2	0.0
DM					387	0.2	
du.					326	0.2	
Menschliche Welt					323	0.2	
V-Partei³					285	0.2	
DKP					261	0.1	
MLPD					148	0.1	0.0
BüSo	Kai-Uwe Ducke	451	0.2	▲0.1	126	0.1	0.0
B*					97	0.1	
SGP					49	0.0	0.0
Informal votes		2,186			1,847		
Total valid votes		186,313			186,652		
Turnout		188,499	79.5	▲5.1			
Left hold	Majority	17,189	9.2	▲4.8			

=== 2013 election ===
Federal election (2013): Berlin-Pankow
Notes:	Blue background denotes the winner of the electorate vote. Pink background denotes a candidate elected from their party list. Yellow background denotes an electorate win by a list member, or other incumbent. A ✓ or ✗ denotes status of any incumbent, win or lose respectively.						
Party	Candidate	Votes	%	±%	Party votes	%	±%
Left	✓ Stefan Liebich	48,926	28.3	▼0.5	43,472	25.2	▼2.4
CDU	Lars Zimmermann	41,295	23.9	▲6.5	40,617	23.5	▲6.3
SPD	Klaus Mindrup	36,180	21.0	▼6.5	38,030	22.0	▲3.8
Greens	Andreas Otto	25,442	14.7	▼1.6	24,300	14.1	▼5.7
AfD	Markus Egg	7,088	4.1		8,372	4.8	
Pirates	Fabricio Martins do Canto	5,860	3.4		6,767	3.9	▼0.2
NPD	Uwe Meenen	2,872	1.7	▼0.6	2,597	1.5	▼0.3
PARTEI	Stefan Valentin	2,220	1.3		1,984	1.1	
FDP	Linus Vollmar	1,581	0.9	▼5.0	4,380	2.5	▼5.8
FW	Sebastian Schmidt	861	0.5		665	0.4	
PRO					547	0.3	
ÖDP					416	0.2	0.0
REP					231	0.1	▼0.2
BüSo	Andreas Weber	322	0.2	▼0.5	182	0.1	▼0.2
MLPD					146	0.1	0.0
PSG					124	0.1	0.0
BIG					84	0.0	
Informal votes		2,414			2,237		
Total valid votes		172,647			172,824		
Turnout		175,061	74.4	▲2.9			
Left hold	Majority	7,631	4.4	▲3.0			

=== 2009 election ===
Federal election (2009): Berlin-Pankow
Notes:	Blue background denotes the winner of the electorate vote. Pink background denotes a candidate elected from their party list. Yellow background denotes an electorate win by a list member, or other incumbent. A ✓ or ✗ denotes status of any incumbent, win or lose respectively.						
Party	Candidate	Votes	%	±%	Party votes	%	±%
Left	Stefan Liebich	47,070	28.8	▲4.5	45,099	27.5	▲3.2
SPD	✗ Wolfgang Thierse	44,769	27.4	▼13.7	29,850	18.2	▼16.3
CDU	Gottfried Ludewig	28,374	17.4	▲2.0	28,163	17.2	▲2.8
Greens	Heiko Thomas	26,674	16.3	▲3.6	32,401	19.8	▲4.0
FDP	Martin Lindner	9,604	5.9	▲2.8	13,626	8.3	▲2.9
Pirates					6,767	4.1	
NPD	Jörg Hähnel	3,702	2.3	0.0	3,007	1.8	0.0
Tierschutzpartei					2,225	1.4	
Independent	Jürgen Heinrich Bernsen	1,396	0.9				
BüSo	Daniel Köppen	1,090	0.7	▲0.2	457	0.3	▲0.1
Independent	Holger Ernst Brandt	584	0.4				
DIE VIOLETTEN					559	0.3	
REP					486	0.3	▼0.2
ÖDP					351	0.2	
DVU					241	0.1	
DKP					235	0.1	
PSG					178	0.1	0.0
MLPD					104	0.1	0.0
Informal votes		2,836			2,350		
Total valid votes		163,263			163,749		
Turnout		166,099	71.5	▼6.3			
Left gain from SPD	Majority	2,301	1.4				

=== 2005 election ===
Federal election (2005):Berlin-Pankow
Notes:	Blue background denotes the winner of the electorate vote. Pink background denotes a candidate elected from their party list. Yellow background denotes an electorate win by a list member, or other incumbent. A ✓ or ✗ denotes status of any incumbent, win or lose respectively.						
Party	Candidate	Votes	%	±%	Party votes	%	±%
SPD	✓ Wolfgang Thierse	70,730	41.1	▼3.6	59,613	34.6	▼3.2
Left	Stefan Liebich	41,864	24.3	▼1.8	42,051	24.4	▲4.2
CDU	Günter Nooke	26,407	15.3	▼1.4	24,750	14.4	▼1.6
Greens	Werner Schulz	21,946	12.8	▲6.3	27,181	15.8	▼0.4
FDP	Gabriele Heise	5,241	3.0	▼0.6	9,839	5.7	▲0.8
NPD	Jörg Hähnel	3,821	2.2		3,235	1.9	▲1.1
GRAUEN					2,366	1.4	▲0.7
Feminist					915	0.5	▲0.1
BüSo	Dieter Kolb	823	0.5	▲0.1	344	0.2	0.0
APPD	Jochen Bix	803	0.5		374	0.2	
REP					792	0.5	▼0.3
PARTEI					713	0.4	
Humanist	Dirk Wanner	486	0.3	▲0.1			
SGP					153	0.1	
MLPD					116	0.1	
Informal votes		2,700			2,379		
Total valid votes		172,121			172,442		
Turnout		174,821	77.8	▲0.7			
SPD hold	Majority	28,866	16.8				
