= PoliticusUSA =

American political website

- Available in: English
- Founded: 2009
- Country of origin: United States

PoliticusUSA is an American left-wing website that publishes hyperpartisan clickbait. Its content has been described by academic studies and journalistic reports as "unreliable", "misleading", and "fake". It is among the most popular U.S. political websites.

PoliticusUSA was established in 2009.

== Content ==
PoliticusUSA's editorial mission is to convey "news, political commentary & analysis from a liberal point of view". While the site aligns itself with a clear political agenda, it rejects the notion that it is politically biased.

Various academic studies and journalistic reports have identified PoliticusUSA as a left-leaning publisher of hyperpartisan content; "misleading", "unreliable", or "fake" news; and clickbait. Writing for Vice, Mike Pearl has described PoliticusUSA as "so one-sided that it's hard to be fully informed if that's all you read", while Slate's Ben Mathis-Lilley has characterized PoliticusUSA as a "low-budget" site "loaded with browser-murdering junk ads". Dante Ramos, a Boston Globe columnist, described a 2016 PoliticusUSA column titled "“Obama Just Annihilated Donald Trump with the Whole World Watching" as "clickbait" and noted it was among a type of story that "never live up to their billing".

PoliticusUSA has published health and medical misinformation. For instance, a 2015 article on the site claimed that the National Institutes of Health discovered marijuana "kills cancer", an assertion rated as False by Snopes, while a 2020 article claimed that the entire population of Oklahoma who took a COVID-19 test, tested positive for the virus, which PolitiFact graded False.

Other stories on PoliticusUSA have also been discredited by fact checkers and mainstream media. For example, in 2018, according to Bloomberg, the site "misleadingly reported ... [Donald] Trump asked for the constitution to be changed so he can be president for 16 years" The previous year, PoliticusUSA reported that "Senior White House officials" stated the 2017 Shayrat missile strike was "intended to make Trump look strong", a claim Snopes classified as False. Also in 2017, PoliticusUSA published a story that claimed "the Russians" had created a fake Bernie Sanders Facebook fan page, a story The Observer described as "fake news".

In 2018, PoliticusUSA re-reported a story from The Guardian that alleged Paul Manafort met with Julian Assange in the embassy of Ecuador in the United Kingdom, a meeting both Manafort and Assange denied taking place. The claims in the story were criticized by Fairness & Accuracy in Reporting for, according to researcher Benjamin Horne, "relying on anonymous sources, not providing any verifiable details, and being, in general, unbelievable given the high level of surveillance in the area surrounding the embassy". In a later investigation of the story, Slate described it as "journalistic malpractice" and riddled with "serious problems"; The Intercept concluded there was no reason to believe the story was true.

== Influence and reach ==
During the time period May 1, 2015 to November 7, 2016, posts on PoliticusUSA that were shared to Twitter and Facebook were among the most-accessed U.S. political content. A 2017 study by Harvard researchers found that PoliticusUSA articles received "substantially more attention on social media than they receive inlinks from open web media". In the summer of 2018, PoliticusUSA traffic coming through Facebook had fallen roughly 80 percent, year over year, after Facebook began demoting from newsfeeds sites "repeatedly dinged by fact-checkers".

As part of a 2020 study, researchers from the Polytechnic University of Milan found that the virality on Twitter of posts by PoliticusUSA and Breitbart outweighed all other sources examined in their research for reach and impact.

== See also ==
- Gateway Pundit
- Palmer Report
