= 7th Heaven (TV series) =

American drama television series (1996–2007)

- Genre: Comedy-drama; Family drama; Romantic drama; Teen drama
- Created by: Brenda Hampton
- Starring: Stephen Collins; Catherine Hicks; Barry Watson; David Gallagher; Jessica Biel; Beverley Mitchell; Mackenzie Rosman; Chaz Lamar Shepherd; Maureen Flannigan; Adam LaVorgna; Nikolas Brino; Lorenzo Brino; Geoff Stults; George Stults; Ashlee Simpson; Rachel Blanchard; Jeremy London; Scotty Leavenworth; Tyler Hoechlin; Sarah Thompson; Haylie Duff; Megan Henning
- Theme music composer: Johnny Rivers, Jack Tempchin and Steve Plunkett
- Composer: Dan Foliart
- Country of origin: United States
- Original language: English
- No. of seasons: 11
- No. of episodes: 243 (list of episodes)

Production
- Executive producers: Brenda Hampton; Aaron Spelling; E. Duke Vincent; Chris Olsen; Jeff Olsen
- Camera setup: Film; Single-camera
- Running time: 43–44 minutes
- Production companies: Spelling Television; CBS Paramount Television

Original release
- Network: The WB
- Release: August 26, 1996 – May 8, 2006
- Network: The CW
- Release: September 25, 2006 – May 13, 2007

7th Heaven is an American family drama television series created and produced by Brenda Hampton. The series debuted on August 26, 1996, on The WB, where it aired for ten seasons through May 8, 2006, making it the longest-running series in the history of The WB. Following the shutdown of The WB and its merger with UPN to form The CW, the series began airing its eleventh and final season on September 25, 2006 on The CW. The final episode aired on May 13, 2007. 7th Heaven was one of the network's first major successful shows and, alongside Buffy the Vampire Slayer and Dawson's Creek, helped in the early success of the WB during the mid to late 1990s. It was also the last series produced by Spelling Television (CBS Paramount Television produced the eleventh and final season) to end its run, as the company was shut down a month after Spelling's death and became an in-name-only unit of CBS Paramount Television.

== Premise ==
The series follows Reverend Eric Camden, a Protestant minister living in the fictional town of Glen Oak, California, and his wife Annie as they deal with the drama of raising seven children (twins Sam and David come later in the series) ranging in age from babies to adults with families of their own.

== Cast and characters ==
- Stephen Collins as Eric Camden
- Catherine Hicks as Annie Camden
- Barry Watson as Matt Camden (seasons 1–6 and 9; recurring 7–8, special guest 10)
- David Gallagher as Simon Camden (seasons 1–7 and 9–10; recurring season 8)
- Jessica Biel as Mary Camden (seasons 1–6; recurring season 7, special guest 8 and 10)
- Beverley Mitchell as Lucy Camden
- Mackenzie Rosman as Ruthie Camden
- Happy the Dog as Happy
- Chaz Lamar Shepherd as John Hamilton (seasons 4–5; recurring in seasons 1–3)
- Maureen Flannigan as Shana Sullivan (season 4; recurring in season 3)
- Adam LaVorgna as Robbie Palmer (seasons 5–7; recurring in season 4)
- Nikolas Brino as Sam Camden (seasons 6–11; uncredited in seasons 3–4, featured in season 5)
- Lorenzo Brino as David Camden (seasons 6–11; uncredited in seasons 3–4, featured in season 5)
- Geoff Stults as Ben Kinkirk (season 7; recurring in seasons 6 and 8–11)
- George Stults as Kevin Kinkirk (seasons 7–11; recurring in season 6)
- Ashlee Simpson as Cecilia Smith (seasons 7–8)
- Rachel Blanchard as Roxanne Richardson (seasons 7–8)
- Jeremy London as Chandler Hampton (seasons 7–8)
- Scotty Leavenworth as Peter Petrowski (season 8; recurring in season 7)
- Tyler Hoechlin as Martin Brewer (seasons 8–11)
- Sarah Thompson as Rose (season 10; recurring in season 9)
- Haylie Duff as Sandy Jameson (seasons 10–11)
- Megan Henning as Meredith Davies (season 10)

== Episodes ==
Season	Episodes	Originally released			Average viewership (in millions)
Season	Episodes	First released	Last released	Network	Average viewership (in millions)
1	22	August 26, 1996	May 19, 1997	The WB	3.24
2	22	September 15, 1997	May 11, 1998	The WB	6.10
3	22	September 21, 1998	May 24, 1999	The WB	8.40
4	22	September 20, 1999	May 22, 2000	The WB	7.22
5	22	October 2, 2000	May 21, 2001	The WB	7.66
6	22	September 24, 2001	May 20, 2002	The WB	7.89
7	22	September 16, 2002	May 19, 2003	The WB	8.11
8	23	September 15, 2003	May 17, 2004	The WB	6.67
9	22	September 13, 2004	May 23, 2005	The WB	6.26
10	22	September 19, 2005	May 8, 2006	The WB	5.62
11	22	September 25, 2006	May 13, 2007	The CW	3.44

== Reception ==
The Parents Television Council (PTC), a conservative media advocacy group, often cited 7th Heaven among the top ten most family-friendly shows. The show was praised for its positive portrayal of a cleric and for promoting honesty, respect for parental authority, and the importance of a strong family and a good education through its story-lines. It was proclaimed the best show in 1998–1999 by the PTC. The council also explained "7th Heaven manages to provide moral solutions to tough issues facing teenagers without seeming preachy or heavy-handed. Additionally, unlike most TV series, 7th Heaven shows the consequences of reckless and irresponsible behavior." It was also noted that "While addressing topics such as premarital sex and peer pressure, these parents [Annie and Eric] are eager to provide wise counsel along with love and understanding."

However, critics felt quite differently about the show. Hillary Frey of Salon cited 7th Heaven as "one of the worst long-running shows on television, making Beverly Hills, 90210 look Shakespearean, while at the same time being one of the most addictive." Reasons given include perceived heavy-handed moralizing, Christian propaganda, and depiction of a caricature of a real family, that is "so clean it is obscene".

Some criticize the predictable storytelling of 7th Heaven. Frey describes the basic pattern followed by each episode: "(1) One of the Camden family has a problem and/or secret; (2) some sort of Three's Company-esque misunderstanding ensues as a result of that problem and/or secret; (3) a confrontation and/or intervention takes place, usually involving a short sermon delivered by one of the Camden parents; and (4) whoever stands at the center of the drama eventually figures out the 'right' thing to do. And 'right' is always another word for 'Christian'; while the show avoids explicit discussions of Jesus and/or faith, Protestant guilt is readily employed as a plot device." On top of this, implausible scenarios are seen to be regularly included, such as the daughter Mary's absence from the show for several seasons being scarcely explained with the character being busy, wayward or in New York.

According to Frey, "the sappiness and sanctimony of the characters often made the moral lessons impossible to swallow". Also, the show is claimed to show an obsession with premarital sex. In this regard, the parents (and eldest son Matt) sometimes depict a sense of ownership over the sexuality of Lucy and Mary by threatening potential romantic interests or negotiating their Lucy and Mary's romantic rights.

=== U.S. ratings ===
7th Heaven was one of the first major hits for the WB and would go on to become the most watched TV series ever on the network. While the first season had modest success with around 3 million viewers, the later seasons often averaged 5 to 7 million viewers. It holds the record for the WB's most watched hour at 12.5 million viewers, on February 8, 1999; 19 of the WB's 20 most watched hours were from 7th Heaven. On May 8, 2006, it was watched by 7.56 million viewers, the highest rating for the WB since January 2005. When the show moved to the CW, ratings dropped. Possible reasons for the decline include an aired "Countdown to Goodbye" ad campaign for the last six months of the 2005–06 season, which promoted it as the final season ever; though the CW announced the series' unexpected renewal, it didn't promote the new season strongly via billboards, bus stops, magazine or on-air promos. Lastly, the network moved 7th Heaven from its long-established Monday night slot to Sunday nights, causing ratings to drop further. The series had a season average of just 3.3 million on the new network, losing 36% of the previous year's audience. It was the third most watched scripted show on the CW. Overall, it was the seventh most watched show.

Viewership and ratings per season of 7th Heaven
Season	Timeslot (ET)	Network	Episodes	First aired		Last aired		TV season	Viewership rank	Avg. viewers (millions)
Season	Timeslot (ET)	Network	Episodes	Date	Viewers (millions)	Date	Viewers (millions)	TV season	Viewership rank	Avg. viewers (millions)
1	Monday 8 p.m.	The WB	22	August 26, 1996	2.8	May 19, 1997	4.15	1996–97	154	3.2
2	Monday 8 p.m.	The WB	22	September 15, 1997	4.63	May 11, 1998	9.33	1997–98	131	5.8
3	Monday 8 p.m.	The WB	22	September 21, 1998	6.29	May 24, 1999	9.60	1998–99	106	7.6
4	Monday 8 p.m.	The WB	22	September 20, 1999	8.67	May 22, 2000	7.43	1999–2000	94	6.4
5	Monday 8 p.m.	The WB	22	October 2, 2000	6.93	May 21, 2001	8.09	2000–01	100	6.9
6	Monday 8 p.m.	The WB	22	September 24, 2001	8.34	May 20, 2002	8.38	2001–02	101	7.0
7	Monday 8 p.m.	The WB	22	September 16, 2002	9.16	May 19, 2003	8.28	2002–03	106	6.6
8	Monday 8 p.m.	The WB	23	September 15, 2003	8.08	May 17, 2004	6.86	2003–04	132	5.5
9	Monday 8 p.m.	The WB	22	September 13, 2004	7.26	May 23, 2005	5.54	2004–05	103	5.3
10	Monday 8 p.m.	The WB	22	September 19, 2005	5.42	May 8, 2006	7.56	2005–06	111	5.2
11	Monday 8 p.m. (Episodes 1–2); Sunday 8 p.m. (Episodes 3–22)	The CW	22	September 25, 2006	4.19	May 13, 2007	3.32	2006–07	133	3.3

=== Awards and nominations ===
- Emmy Awards
  - 1997: Outstanding Art Direction for a Series (Patricia Van Ryker and Mary Ann Good) – Nominated
- ASCAP Film and Television Music Awards
  - 2000: Top TV Series (Dan Foliart) – Won
  - 2001: Top TV Series (Dan Foliart) – Won
- Family Television Awards
  - 1999: Best Drama – Won
  - 2002: Best Drama – Won
- Kids' Choice Awards
  - 1999: Favorite Television Show – Nominated
  - 2000: Favorite Animal Star (Happy the dog) – Nominated
  - 2001: Favorite Television Show – Nominated
  - 2002: Favorite Television Show – Nominated
  - 2003: Favorite Television Show – Nominated
- TV Guide Awards
  - 1999: Best Show You're not Watching – Won
  - 2000: Favorite TV Pet (Happy the dog) – Nominated
- Teen Choice Awards
  - 1999: TV Choice Actor (Barry Watson) – Nominated
  - 1999: TV Choice Drama – Nominated
  - 2000: TV Choice Drama – Nominated
  - 2001: TV Choice Actor (Barry Watson) – Nominated
  - 2001: TV Choice Drama – Nominated
  - 2002: TV Choice Drama/Action Adventure – Won
  - 2002: TV Choice Actor in Drama (Barry Watson) – Won
  - 2002: TV Choice Actress in Drama (Jessica Biel) – Nominated
  - 2003: TV Choice Drama/Action Adventure – Won
  - 2003: TV Choice Actor in Drama/Action Adventure (David Gallagher) – Won
  - 2003: TV Choice Breakout Star – Male (George Stults) – Won
  - 2003: TV Choice Actress in Drama/Action Adventure (Jessica Biel) – Nominated
  - 2003: TV Choice Breakout Star – Female (Ashlee Simpson) – Nominated
  - 2004: TV Choice Breakout Star – Male (Tyler Hoechlin) – Nominated
  - 2004: TV Choice Actor in Drama/Action Adventure (David Gallagher) – Nominated
  - 2004: TV Choice Drama/Action Adventure – Nominated
  - 2005: TV Choice Actor in Drama/Action Adventure (Tyler Hoechlin) – Nominated
  - 2005: TV Choice Actress in Drama/Action Adventure (Beverley Mitchell) – Nominated
  - 2005: TV Choice Parental Units (Stephen Collins and Catherine Hicks) – Nominated
  - 2005: TV Choice Drama/Action Adventure – Nominated
  - 2006: TV Choice Breakout Star – Female (Haylie Duff) – Nominated
  - 2006: TV Choice Parental Units (Stephen Collins and Catherine Hicks) – Nominated
- Young Artist Awards
  - 1997: Best Family TV Drama Series – Won
  - 1997: Best Performance in a Drama Series – Young Actress (Beverley Mitchell) – Won
  - 1997: Best Performance in a Drama Series – Young Actor (David Gallagher) – Nominated
  - 1997: Best Performance in a TV Comedy/Drama – Supporting Young Actress Age Ten or Under (Mackenzie Rosman) – Nominated
  - 1998: Best Family TV Drama Series – Won (tied with Promised Land)
  - 1998: Best Performance in a TV Drama Series – Leading Young Actress (Beverley Mitchell) – Won (tied with Sarah Schaub)
  - 1998: Best Performance in a TV Drama Series – Guest Starring Young Actor (Bobby Brewer) – Nominated
  - 1998: Best Performance in a TV Drama Series – Guest Starring Young Actress (Danielle Keaton) – Nominated
  - 1998: Best Performance in a TV Drama Series – Guest Starring Young Actress (Molly Orr) – Nominated
  - 1998: Best Performance in a TV Drama Series – Leading Young Actor (David Gallagher) – Nominated
  - 1998: Best Performance in a TV Drama Series – Leading Young Actress (Jessica Biel) – Nominated
  - 1998: Best Performance in a TV Drama Series – Supporting Young Actress (Mackenzie Rosman) – Nominated
  - 1999: Best Family TV Drama Series – Nominated
  - 1999: Best Performance in a TV Drama Series – Guest Starring Young Actor (Craig Hauer) – Nominated
  - 1999: Best Performance in a TV Series – Young Ensemble (Beverley Mitchell, Barry Watson, Jessica Biel, David Gallagher, Mackenzie Rosman) – Nominated
  - 2000: Best Performance in a TV Drama Series – Guest Starring Young Actress (Kaitlin Cullum) – Won
  - 2000: Best Performance in a TV Drama Series – Leading Young Actress (Beverley Mitchell) – Won
  - 2000: Best Family TV Series – Drama – Nominated
  - 2001: Best Performance in a TV Drama Series – Guest Starring Young Actress (Brooke Anne Smith) – Won
  - 2001: Best Family TV Drama Series – Nominated
  - 2001: Best Performance in a TV Drama Series – Guest Starring Young Actress (Jamie Lauren) – Nominated
  - 2002: Best Family TV Drama Series – Nominated
  - 2002: Best Performance in a TV Drama Series – Guest Starring Young Actress (Ashley Edner) – Nominated
  - 2002: Best Performance in a TV Drama Series – Leading Young Actor (David Gallagher) – Nominated
  - 2002: Best Performance in a TV Drama Series – Supporting Young Actress (Mackenzie Rosman) – Nominated
  - 2004: Best Performance in a TV Series (Comedy or Drama) – Supporting Young Actress (Mackenzie Rosman) – Won
  - 2005: Best Family Television Series (Drama) – Nominated
  - 2005: Best Performance in a TV Series (Comedy or Drama) – Leading Young Actor (Tyler Hoechlin) – Nominated
  - 2006: Best Performance in a TV Series (Comedy or Drama) – Young Actor Age Ten or Younger (Drake Johnston) – Nominated
  - 2007: Best Family Television Series (Drama) – Nominated
  - 2007: Best Performance in a TV Series (Comedy or Drama) – Supporting Young Actress (Mackenzie Rosman) – Nominated
  - 2007: Best Performance in a TV Series (Comedy or Drama) – Young Actor Age Ten or Younger (Nikolas Brino and Lorenzo Brino) – Nominated
  - 2008: Best Performance in a TV Series – Young Actor Ten or Under (Lorenzo Brino) – Nominated
  - 2008: Best Performance in a TV Series – Young Actor Ten or Under (Nikolas Brino) – Nominated
- Young Star Awards
  - 1997: Best Performance by a Young Actor in a Drama TV Series (David Gallagher) – Nominated
  - 1998: Best Performance by a Young Actress in a Drama TV Series (Beverley Mitchell) – Nominated
  - 1998: Best Performance by a Young Actress in a Drama TV Series (Jessica Biel) – Nominated
  - 1998: Best Performance by a Young Actor in a Drama TV Series (David Gallagher) – Won
  - 1999: Best Performance by a Young Actor in a Drama TV Series (David Gallagher) – Nominated
  - 2000: Best Performance by a Young Actor in a Drama TV Series (David Gallagher) – Nominated
  - 2000: Best Young Ensemble Cast – Television (David Gallagher, Jessica Biel, Beverley Mitchell, Mackenzie Rosman) – Nominated

== Availability ==
=== Syndication ===
Paramount Skydance currently handles both the domestic and international distribution of the series. Season one episodes were retitled 7th Heaven Beginnings. Although the series did not receive a rating other than TV-G throughout its 11-season run, reruns on some cable/satellite channels have been given either a TV-PG or TV-14 rating (depending on the subject matter).

In the United States, the show began airing reruns in off-network syndication on September 25, 2000, but ceased to air in syndication in September 2002, while the series was still in first-run broadcast on The WB and later on The CW. The show then aired on the ABC Family channel from the fall of 2002 until 2008. Then, it was announced on April 1, 2010, that ABC Family had re-obtained the rights to the series, and would begin airing it at 11 a.m. (ET/PT) on weekdays beginning April 12, 2010. However, after one week, ABC Family abruptly pulled the show and replaced it with a third daily airing of Gilmore Girls.

In 2012, GMC (now known as UP) is the first network to air 7th Heaven in the United States since 2010 and began airing the series with a marathon on July 7, 2012. Due to allegations of child molestation against Stephen Collins, the network pulled the series from its schedule as of the afternoon of October 7, 2014. 7th Heaven briefly returned to UP in December 2014; however, it was quickly removed from the schedule. UP CEO Charley Humbard stated, "We brought the show back because many viewers expressed they could separate allegations against one actor from the fictional series itself. As it turns out, they cannot." However, in the summer of 2015, UP brought back the series, where from then until 2019 it aired weekdays from 12:00PM to 3:00 PM. It was again pulled from UP's schedule afterwards. Previously, it aired on GetTV and Hallmark Drama.

In Ireland the show was aired on RTÉ. In the UK the show was aired on Sky One as part of their midweek prime time slot.

=== Home media ===
CBS DVD (distributed by Paramount Home Entertainment) has released 7th Heaven on DVD. They have released all 11 seasons in Region 1. In region 2, seasons 1-7 have been released while in region 4 the first 6 seasons have been released on DVD.

On August 22, 2017, it was announced that the complete series would be released on DVD for November 14.

Title	Episode #	Year	Region 1	Region 2	Region 3	Region 4 (Australia)	Discs
1	22	1996–1997	September 14, 2004	September 4, 2006	September 7, 2006	September 7, 2006	6
2	22	1997–1998	February 8, 2005	March 11, 2008	March 24, 2008	January 10, 2008	6
3	22	1998–1999	November 28, 2006	May 27, 2008	May 8, 2008	June 5, 2008	6
4	22	1999–2000	March 27, 2007	August 8, 2008	November 13, 2008	November 6, 2008	6
5	22	2000–2001	December 4, 2007	March 11, 2009	March 26, 2009	July 2, 2009	6
6	22	2001–2002	June 10, 2008	September 30, 2009	2009	December 24, 2009	6
7	22	2002–2003	November 11, 2008	January 26, 2011	November 19, 2009	TBA	5
8	23	2003–2004	March 3, 2009	TBA	TBA	TBA	5
9	22	2004–2005	November 17, 2009	TBA	TBA	TBA	5
10	22	2005–2006	March 23, 2010	TBA	TBA	TBA	5
11	22	2006–2007	November 23, 2010	TBA	TBA	TBA	5
The Complete Series	243	1996–2007	November 14, 2017	TBA	TBA	TBA	61

== Reboot series ==
In May 2025, it was announced a reboot of the show was in development at CBS Studios. Additionally, Anthony Sparks was named as the showrunner and an executive producer along with Biel and DeVon Franklin serving as executive producers.
