= Ben Mathis-Lilley =

American journalist

Ben Mathis-Lilley is an American journalist and the chief news blogger of Slate's news section, The Slatest. He was formerly a contributor to Slate.

== Biography ==
Mathis-Lilley worked at New York, where he began as an editorial assistant in 2004. While at New York, his tasks included overseeing "The Approval Matrix," a feature humorously graphing multiple things in regards to two qualities. in June 2012, he was hired by BuzzFeed, where he served as the website's sports editor until his firing in March 2014. He began contributing to Slate the same year.
