= Stefan Liebich =

German politician (born 1972)

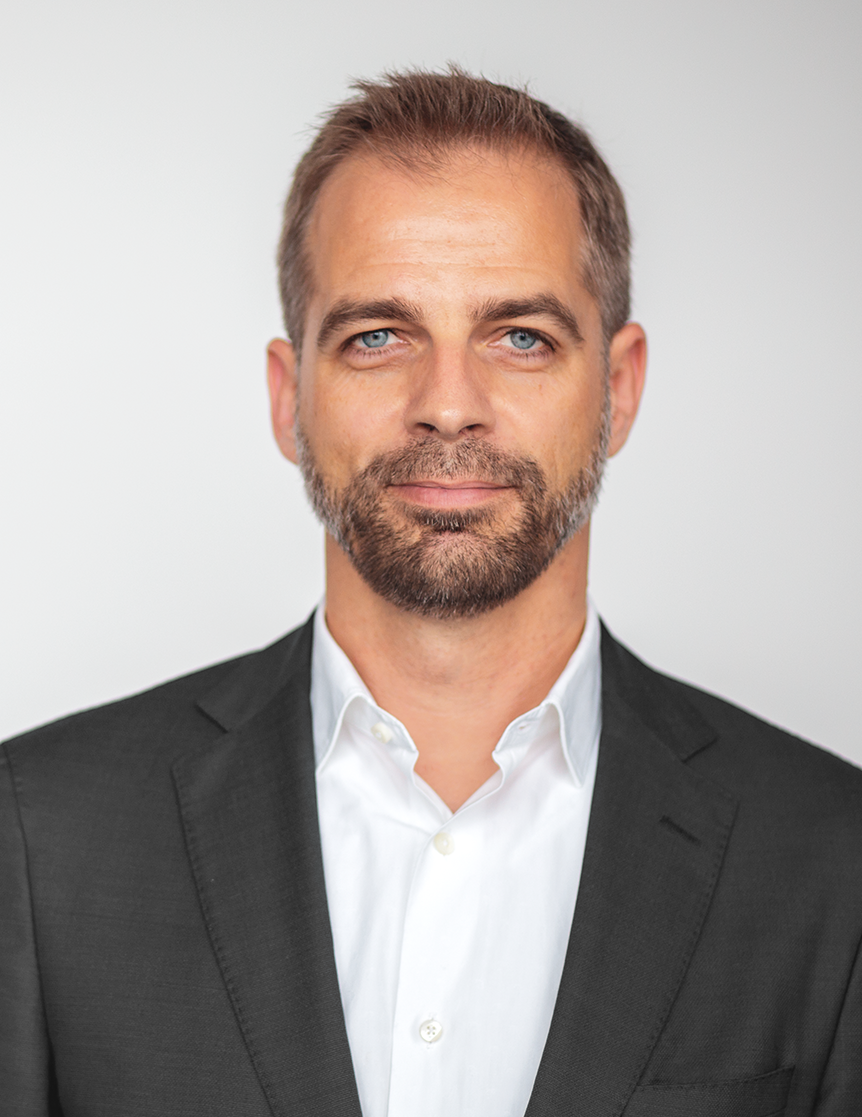
- Liebich in 2017

Member of the Bundestag; for Berlin-Pankow
- In office 27 October 2009 – 26 October 2021
- Preceded by: Wolfgang Thierse
- Succeeded by: Stefan Gelbhaar
Berlin state politics (1995–2009)
Leader of the Party of Democratic Socialism in Berlin
In office 1 December 2001 – 3 December 2005
Preceded by	Petra Pau
Succeeded by	Klaus Lederer
Leader of the Party of Democratic Socialism at the Berlin House of Representatives
In office 29 August 2002 – 26 October 2006
Deputy	Carola Bluhm; Marion Seelig; Uwe Doering
Preceded by	Harald Wolf
Succeeded by	Carola Bluhm
Member of the Berlin House of Representatives
In office 30 November 1995 – 31 October 2009
Preceded by	Constituency established
Succeeded by	Gernot Klemm
Constituency	Marzahn (1995–2001); Marzahn-Hellersdorf (2001–2006); State list (2006–2009)

Personal details
- Born: Stefan Liebich; 30 December 1972 (age 53) Wismar, East Germany
- Party: The Left (2007–2026)
- Other political affiliations: PDS (1990–2007)
- Spouse: Hillary Frey (m. 2023)

Stefan Liebich (born 30 December 1972) is the director of the Rosa Luxemburg Stiftung New York Office and was a German politician, who served as a member of the Bundestag for the Democratic Socialist party The Left (DIE LINKE) between 2009 and 2021.

== Early life and education ==
Liebich was born on 30 December 1972 in the East German city of Wismar and spent his childhood in Greifswald. In 1983, he moved with his family to Berlin. According to Liebich he was approached by the Stasi at the age of 13, who asked him if he could imagine working for them at a later time. After completing his Abitur in 1991, he graduated from the Berlin University of Applied Sciences and Technology in business economics with a focus on information systems in 1995. He is not religious. Liebich is married to Hillary Frey and lives with her in Brooklyn, New York.

== Party ==
In the GDR, Stefan Liebich was a member of the marxist youth organisation FDJ. in 1990, on his 18th birthday, he joined the Party of Democratic Socialism (PDS).

In 1996 and 1998 the PDS in Marzahn elected him as chair of the district. In December 1999 he was elected vice-chair of the PDS in Berlin. In 2001 he succeeded Petra Pau as chairman of the Berlin PDS and was re-elected in 2003.

In October 2005 Liebich announced that he would not run for chairman of the Berlin PDS again. He proposed Klaus Lederer as his successor.

In January 2026 Liebich left DIE LINKE and announced he wants to focus on supporting the Democrats in his new home country.

== Political positions ==
Liebich has been known to work for a red-red-green coalition on a federal level. Since 2009 he has hosted meetings between the party's MPs to find a common ground.

He represented the moderate, reformist wing of the party and advocates for an involvement of the party with government.

== Member of Parliament ==
=== Berlin House of Representatives ===
In 1995, 1999 and 2001 Stefan Liebich was voted into the Berlin House of Representatives for the Marzahn constituency. At the 2006 election he did not manage to win the direct mandate for Prenzlauer Berg and was subsequently elected via the PDS list.

From 2002 to 2006 he was the Chairman of the PDS parliamentary group.

=== Bundestag ===
Liebich ran for office for the PDS in 2002 in Berlin-Mitte and in 2005 for The Left in Berlin-Pankow. Both times he lost to the candidates of the SPD. In 2009 Liebich managed to win the direct mandate in Pankow for the first time, beating the incumbent Wolfgang Thierse. At the 2013 and 2017 elections he also won the direct mandate.

He was the chairman of the parliamentary group of The Left in the Foreign Affairs committee of the Bundestag and the groups spokesperson for foreign policy.

In February 2020, Liebich said that he will not seek re-election to the Bundestag in the 2021 German federal election., and subsequently left office on 26 October 2021.

Since 2023 he is the director of the Rosa Luxemburg Stiftung New York Office.

== Publications ==
- Stefan Liebich, Gerry Woop (Hrsg.): Linke Außenpolitik: Reformperspektiven. WeltTrends, Potsdam 2013, ISBN 978-3-941880-65-8
