= European Security Council =

The European Security Council is a proposed body of the European Union that, if established, would serve the role of coordinating security decisions at the Union level. It was formally endorsed by President Ursula von der Leyen in a State of the Union speech to the European Parliament on 16 September 2026. It was presented as a means of security cooperation alongside Canada, Norway, the United Kingdom and Ukraine, in addition with other measures, including a new European security strategy, an emergency security protocol, and a European instrument for strategic enablers.

The proposal dates back to the 1980s, with various supporters including former president Jean-Claude Juncker and French president Emmanuel Macron. The most recent proposal, from Sergey Lagodinsky, would be established by treaty and would consist of representatives from Germany, France, Italy, Spain, Poland and the U.K. — alongside two rotating seats for smaller countries and the European Parliament president. In addition, it would make decisions by Supermajority rather than unanimity.
