= Matter (online magazine) =

- Website type: Online magazine
- Available in: English
- Owner: Matter Studio
- Creators: Bobbie Johnson and Jim Giles
- Editor: Mark Lotto
- Website: medium.com/matter
- Commercial: Yes
- Launched: 2012; 14 years ago

Matter is the online magazine published by Matter Studios, a multi-platform content studio owned by Twitter founder Evan Williams (Internet entrepreneur)

== History and profile ==
Matter began life as an online publication specializing in long-form articles about science, technology, medicine, and the environment. The founders, journalists Bobbie Johnson and Jim Giles, funded the project by raising $140,000 on Kickstarter in March 2012. Following the successful campaign, an initial release of the online magazine was designed by Paul Lloyd and Jeremy Keith of Clearleft, and developed by Phil Gyford. The success of the campaign generated discussion about new business models in journalism.

In April 2013, Johnson and Giles announced that Matter had been acquired by Medium, a new publishing platform established by Twitter founder Ev Williams. In June 2014, Matter was relaunched as a general interest publication under editor-in-chief Mark Lotto.

In February 2016, Matter became the first digital publication to win a National Magazine Award in the prestigious category of reporting, for Joshua Hammer's story on the Ebola epidemic, "My Nurses Are Dead, and I Don't Know If I'm Already Infected."

In March 2016, Medium spun off Matter into an independent company, Matter Studios, owned by Medium founder Ev Williams. As part of its expansion into Matter Studios, under co-chief creative officers Mark Lotto and Hillary Frey, it produces digital journalism, podcasts, books, live events, documentaries, and web series.
