= Dear Prudence (advice column) =

Column in Slate magazine

Dear Prudence is an advice column appearing several times weekly in the online magazine Slate and syndicated to over 200 newspapers.

== History ==
=== Herbert Stein ===
The column was initiated on 20 December 1997. "Prudence" was a pseudonym, and the author's true identity was not revealed at the time. Slate's archive currently indicates that the author of those first columns was Herbert Stein. Stein ceased writing the column after three months and the column went on hiatus.

=== Margo Howard ===
In mid-March 1998, the column returned, with the explanation that "Prudence" had not come back from her "needlework"—per the explanation offered in Stein's last column—but rather had convinced her daughter and namesake to continue her work. While similarly anonymous at first, the new author of the column was eventually revealed to be Margo Howard, the daughter of Esther Lederer, a.k.a. Ann Landers.

Howard maintained the column for nearly eight years. Her last Dear Prudence column appeared in Slate on 2 February 2006. Howard then had a Creators Syndicate advice column called "Dear Margo", whose run ended on Friday, 10 May 2013.

=== Emily Yoffe ===
On 9 February 2006, Dear Prudence was taken over by Slate staffer Emily Yoffe. Beginning in the summer of 2007, when Slate video magazine Slate V was launched, Yoffe also appeared in short, videorecorded Dear Prudence clips, illustrated with animations.

=== Daniel M. Lavery ===
In November 2015, Daniel M. Lavery, writer and co-founder of The Toast, took up the "Prudence" role from Yoffe, but wrote as Mallory Ortberg until April 2018. In June 2016, Slate launched the "Dear Prudence" podcast to accompany the column. Lavery, usually accompanied by one or two guests, discussed and responded to additional letters in weekly episodes.

Lavery moved on from the role in May 2021.

=== Jenée Desmond-Harris ===
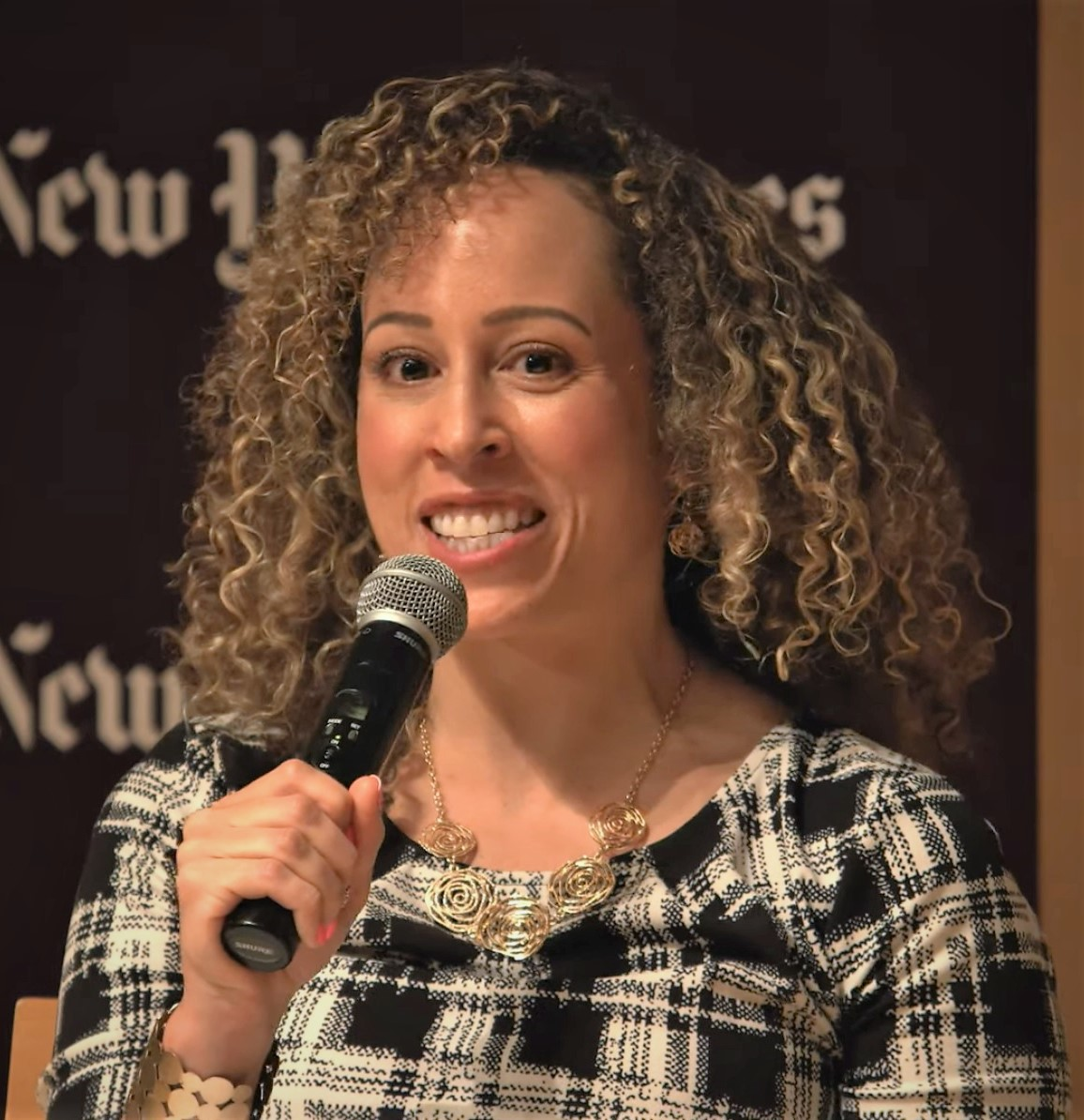
Jenée Desmond-Harris hosts a discussion at the San Francisco Public Library in 2019

Writer and New York Times Opinion Editor Jenée Desmond-Harris took over the column starting June 3, 2021. R. Eric Thomas took over during Desmond-Harris' parental leave in spring and summer 2022. Desmond-Harris took another parental leave from September 2024 to the end of March 2025 and Delia Cai filled in.

== Cultural reference ==
The title of the column is a reference to the Beatles song "Dear Prudence".
