= Jim Giles (reporter) =

Science and technology journalist

- Education: University of Bristol; University of Oxford
- Occupation: Journalist
- Website: www.jimgiles.net

Jim Giles is a journalist and business executive. He is currently a vice president at GreenBiz.

Giles was previously a journalist and CEO of Timeline, which published historical stories primarily focused on the topics of race, class, and gender and how they relate to today. He co-founded Matter, an online publication specialising in long-form articles on science and technology.

He has written about science, politics and the environment for The Atlantic, The New York Times, Nature, New Scientist and The Guardian.

Until April 2007, Giles wrote full-time for the journal Nature. In December 2005, he and colleagues published a story that compared the accuracy of science articles on English Wikipedia to those in Encyclopædia Britannica. Peer reviewers recruited by Nature identified an average of four inaccuracies in the English Wikipedia articles they examined and an average of around three in articles on the same topics in Britannica. Britannica subsequently criticized the story, prompting Nature to clarify the methodology used to compile the results.

In 2009, Giles asked ten prominent scientists to come together and discuss the future of the Nobel Prizes. The group, which included Tim Hunt, winner of the 2001 Nobel Prize in physiology or medicine, called for the creation of new Nobel prizes for the environment and public health. The group also recommended expanding the medicine prize to include disciplines such as ecology, which are not currently covered by the prize. The group's recommendations were published on 5 October 2009 in an open letter to the Nobel Foundation.

In March 2012, Giles and fellow journalist Bobbie Johnson completed a successful Kickstarter campaign for Matter, a new science and technology publication. The campaign raised $140,201. Matter published its first article, a 7,800-word story about a rare neurological condition, in November 2012. Matter was acquired by Medium in April 2013.

Giles studied physics at the University of Bristol. He received a master's degree in computational neuroscience from the University of Oxford. Giles initially developed exhibitions at the Science Museum in London, joining Nature in 2001 as a news and features editor and becoming a reporter for the journal in 2003.
