= Emily Yoffe =

American journalist

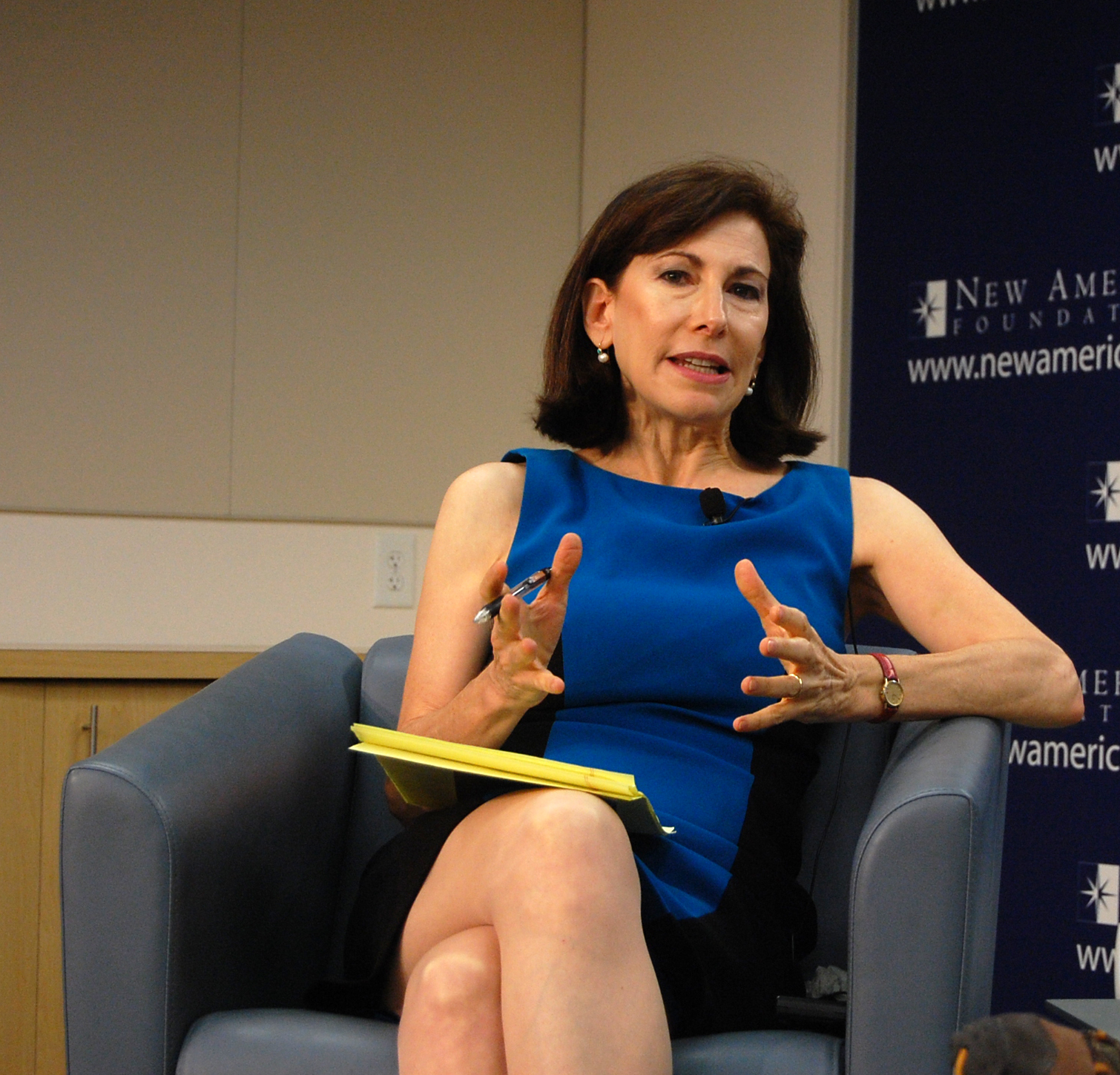
Emily Yoffe at a New America Foundation discussion in 2011.

Emily J. Yoffe (born October 15, 1955) is an American journalist and contributing writer for The Atlantic. From 1998 to 2016 she was a regular contributor to Slate magazine, notably as Dear Prudence. She has also written for The New York Times; O, The Oprah Magazine; The Washington Post; Esquire; the Los Angeles Times; Texas Monthly; and many other publications. Yoffe began her career as a staff writer at The New Republic before moving on to other publications.

== Early life and education ==
Yoffe grew up in Newton, Massachusetts, and graduated from Wellesley College in 1977.

In 2012, five years after U.S. Representative Robert Drinan's death, Yoffe said that he had sexually assaulted her when she was "a teenager of 18 or 19."

== Career ==
In 2006 outgoing columnist Margo Howard turned Slate's "Dear Prudence" advice column over to Yoffe. The column appears four times per week, including one day of live chats and one day in which the letters are responded to using a video instead of text. In November 2015, Yoffe published her last "Dear Prudence" column, and was replaced by Daniel M. Lavery, co-founder of The Toast. Lavery left Dear Prudence in 2021.

Yoffe also hosted a podcast called "Manners for the Digital Age" with Slate's then-technology columnist Farhad Manjoo.

She wrote a regular feature on Slate called "Human Guinea Pig", in which she attempted unusual activities or hobbies. For "Human Guinea Pig", she has tried hypnosis, and taken a vow of silence. She has become a street performer, a nude model for an art class, and a contestant in the Mrs. America beauty pageant.

In June 2005, Bloomsbury published Yoffe's What the Dog Did: Tales from a Formerly Reluctant Dog Owner. That year it was named Best Book of the Year by Dogwise, and selected as the Best General Interest Dog Book by the Dog Writers Association of America.

She was a guest on The Colbert Report twice. She discussed her experiences as Slate's "Human Guinea Pig", and an article about narcissistic personality disorder. She has been a guest on numerous radio programs, including The Emily Rooney Show and Minnesota Public Radio.

Yoffe has written pieces about the worldwide disappearance of frogs and the crash of Air Florida Flight 90 for The New York Times Magazine. She has written op-eds for The Washington Post on global warming, motherhood, and politics.

As of December 2022, she is a writer for The Free Press.

=== Writings on the Me Too movement and campus sexual assault ===
Yoffe has written extensively about campus sexual assault and the Obama administration's effort to end it, describing the administration's reforms of Title IX – the United States federal law prohibiting sex discrimination in federally-funded education programs – as a worthy goal that went awry. Her article in Slate, "The College Rape Overcorrection" was a National Magazine Award finalist in Public Service in 2015. She wrote a series on campus sexual assault for The Atlantic on due process, junk science, and racial disparities. The series was a nominee for Top Ten Works of Journalism of the Decade by New York University's Arthur L. Carter Journalism Institute.

She has praised the Me Too movement; but expressed concerns about overreach. She wrote about "The Problem With #BelieveSurvivors", the consequences of Al Franken's resignation from the Senate, and the dangers of "endlessly expand[ing] the categories of victim and perpetrator."

She is a signer of A Letter on Justice and Open Debate published in Harper's Magazine. She is a member of the board of advisors of Persuasion.community, an organization that says it defends the ideals of a free society, for which she wrote "A Taxonomy of Fear", which describes her understanding of the term "cancel culture".

=== Writings on transgender rights ===
In March 2023, Yoffe interviewed whistleblower Jamie Reed for The Free Press, whose claims that children were harmed through inadequate care at The Washington University Transgender Center at St. Louis Children's Hospital have been disputed by several former coworkers and the parents of many patients. The claims are currently being investigated by The Washington University Transgender Center and the State of Missouri. In April 2023, Yoffe wrote an article interviewing a mother whose child received gender-affirming care from the Washington University Medical Center, claiming that the receipt of this care made her child's mental health deteriorate. A Twitter user saying they were the child has contradicted these claims on social media, saying that their deteriorating mental health at the time of receiving gender-affirming care had nothing to do with them being transgender and that they felt the article violated their consent.

== Books ==
- What the Dog Did: Tales from a Formerly Reluctant Dog Owner (2005)

== Awards ==
- Dogwise: Best Book of the Year (2005)
- Dog Writers Association of America: Best General Interest Dog Book (2005)
