= Julia Schneider =

German politician (born 1990)

Julia Schneider MdB
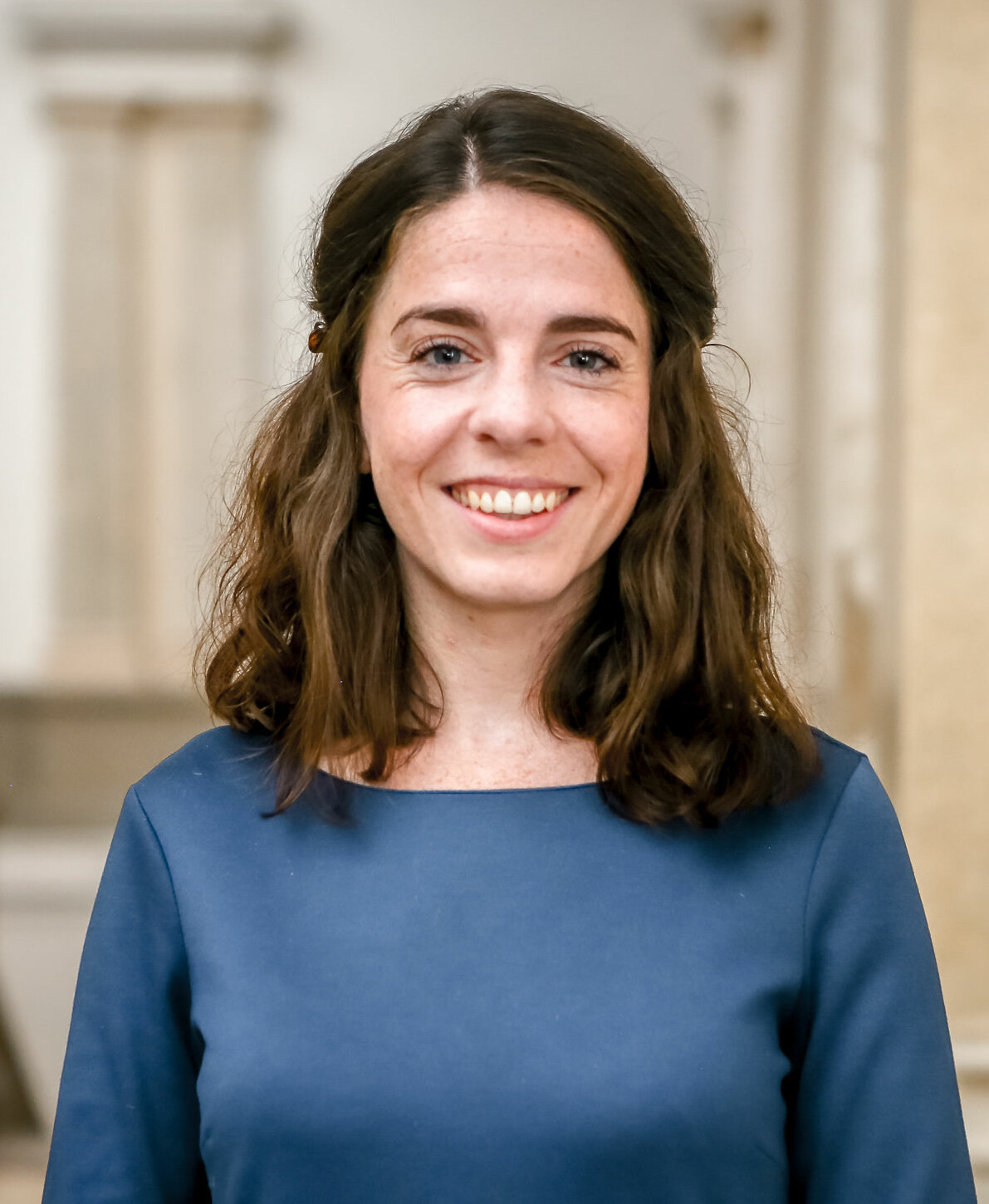
- Schneider in 2021

Member of the Bundestag; for Berlin-Pankow
- Incumbent
- Assumed office 25 March 2025
- Preceded by: Stefan Gelbhaar

Member of the; Berlin House of Representatives; for Pankow 7
- In office 4 November 2021 – 7 May 2025
- Preceded by: Clara West
- Succeeded by: Benedikt Lux

Personal details
- Born: Julia Schneider; 5 March 1990 (age 36) East Berlin, East Germany
- Party: Alliance 90/The Greens
- Education: University of Regensburg; Complutense University of Madrid; European University Viadrina; Speyer University

Julia Schneider (born 5 March 1990) is a German administrative scientist and politician of Alliance 90/The Greens who has been serving as a member of the Bundestag since 2025, having previously served as a member of the Abgeordnetenhaus of Berlin from 2021 to 2025.

== Early life and education ==
Schneider was born in East Berlin in 1990, shortly before German reunification. She grew up in Neu-Hohenschönhausen and later Freiburg im Breisgau. After completing secondary school, she studied German-Spanish studies at the University of Regensburg and the Complutense University of Madrid from 2010 to 2013, graduating with a Bachelor of Arts. This was followed by further studies at the European University Viadrina in Frankfurt an der Oder, where she earned a Master of Arts in intercultural communication studies in 2016 and another in European studies in 2016. In 2020, she completed a postgraduate course in administrative sciences at Speyer University.

Schneider speaks German, English, Spanish, French, and Polish.

== Early career ==
After her studies, Schneider moved to Berlin and became a research assistant at the Bundestag, where she worked for Greens MdB Sven-Christian Kindler from 2017 to 2018. She was then a trainee at the Department for Interior and Sports in the Senate of Berlin from 2018 to 2020. In February 2021, she became a civil servant in the transport department.

== Political career ==
Schneider joined the Greens in 2017. From 2020 to 2021, she was a member of the executive of the party's Pankow district association. In 2021, she was nominated as candidate for the Pankow 7 constituency in the 2021 Berlin state election as well as 31st position on the state party list. She was elected to the Abgeordnetenhaus of Berlin, winning Pankow 7 with 30.7% of votes. She became deputy chair of the Greens parliamentary group and spokeswoman for personnel and administration, budget policy, and forest policy.
