= Josh Voorhees =

American journalist

Josh Voorhees is an American political and investigative journalist whose work has appeared in the New York Times, The Guardian, and Scientific American, among other national outlets.

He is an investigative editor at Fieldnotes, a public interest watchdog focused on the oil and gas industry. Previously, he was a senior writer for Slate, and the editor of its news blog, The Slatest. He currently lives in Boston, Massachusetts.

== Career ==
Voorhees earned a BA from Davidson College and an MPH from Johns Hopkins University. He briefly worked as a teacher in London, England before becoming a journalist.

One of his first beats was at E&E News, where he covered the auto industry. He later worked at Politico, where he wrote the Morning Energy newsletter, before joining Slate to launch the magazine's news and aggregation vertical.

In 2013, he was named a fellow of the Kiplinger Program by Ohio State University, and in 2021, he was named a fellow at the Pulitzer Center. In 2009, The Hill named him one of the 50 most beautiful people of the year. His environmental reporting has appeared in a number of publications, including Mother Jones, Grist, Drilled, and HEATED.
