= Daniela Kluckert =

German politician

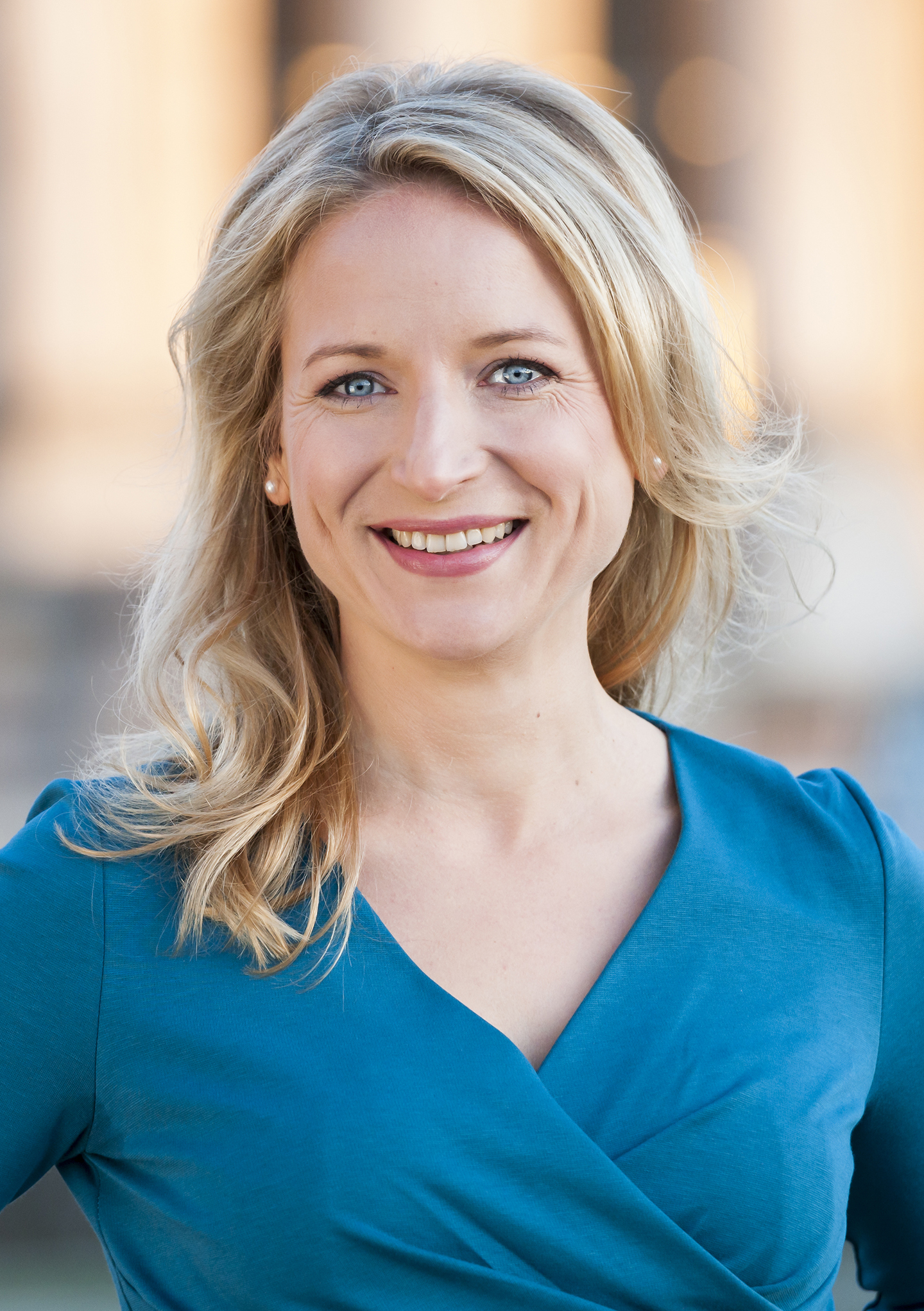
- Kluckert in 2017

Member of the Bundestag
- In office 2017–2025

Personal details
- Born: 22 December 1980 (age 45) Nürnberg, West Germany
- Party: FDP
- Education: Free University of Berlin

Daniela Kluckert (née Lange, born 22 December 1980) is a German politician of the Free Democratic Party (FDP) who served as a member of the Bundestag from the state of Berlin from 2017 to 2025.

In addition to her parliamentary work, Kluckert served as Parliamentary State Secretary in the Federal Ministry of Transport and Digital Infrastructure in the coalition government of Chancellor Olaf Scholz from 2021 to 2024. In this capacity, she was also the Federal Commissioner for the Infrastructure of Charging Stations.

== Early life and career ==
Kluckert was born in Nürnberg, Bavaria, but grew up in Weißenborn. After graduating from high school in 2002, she began studying economics at the University of Würzburg and the Free University of Berlin, where she graduated with a diploma.

From 2009 to 2013 Kluckert worked as an assistant to Christiane Ratjen-Damerau, a member of the German Bundestag. Afterwards she worked as an adviser for Saxony's State Ministry for Economic Affairs, based at the state's representative office in Berlin.

== Political career ==
Kluckert joined the FDP in 2005. She became a member of the Bundestag in the 2017 German federal election, representing Berlin-Pankow. In parliament, she served as deputy chairwoman of the Committee on Transport and Digital Infrastructure from 2018 until 2021.

From 8 December 2017 until 7 November 2024, Kluckert served as Parliamentary State Secretary at the Federal Ministry for Digital and Transport led by fellow party member Volker Wissing. On 7 November she resigned due to the dismissal of FDP chairman Christian Lindner by chancellor Olaf Scholz and the subsequent 2024 German government crisis, unlike Wissing who remained in the government while leaving the FDP. She strongly disapproved Wissing's stay in the government and explained that in her view the members of the Bundestag are elected to serve their party and party manifest ("wir sind für eine Partei, für ein Programm gewählt").
