= Stefan Gelbhaar =

German politician (born 1976)

- Gelbhaar in 2020

Member of the Bundestag; from Berlin
- In office 24 October 2017 – 25 March 2025
- Preceded by: Multi-member district
- Succeeded by: Julia Schneider
- Constituency: State list (2017–2021); Berlin-Pankow (2021–2025)

Member of the Berlin House of Representatives
- In office 27 October 2011 – 31 December 2017
- Preceded by: Multi-member district
- Succeeded by: Nicole Ludwig
- Constituency: State list (2011–2016); Pankow 8 (2016–2017)

Personal details
- Born: 9 July 1976 (age 50) Friedrichshain, East Berlin, East Germany
- Party: Alliance 90/The Greens
- Children: 2
- Education: Humboldt University of Berlin
- Occupation: Lawyer, politician

Stefan Gelbhaar (born 9 July 1976) is a German lawyer and politician of the Alliance 90/The Greens who has been serving as a member of the Bundestag from the state of Berlin until 2021, when he gained the seat of Berlin-Pankow.

== Early life and career ==
Born in Friedrichshain, East Berlin, Gelbhaar has lived in the Berlin district of Pankow since 1980. He attended the "Neumannschule" (30th POS) and the Carl-von-Ossietzky-Gymnasium, and later became a student at Humboldt University. He completed his legal clerkship in the state of Brandenburg. Afterwards he worked as a criminal defence lawyer.

== Political career ==
From 2011 until 2017, Gelbhaar served as a member of the State Parliament of Berlin, where he was his parliamentary group's spokesperson on transport.

Gelbhaar has been a member of the German Bundestag since the 2017 elections, representing Berlin-Pankow. In parliament, he is a member of the Committee on Transport and Digital Infrastructure and also serves as his parliamentary group's spokesman on urban mobility and cycling.

In addition to his committee assignments, Gelbhaar co-chairs the German-Korean Parliamentary Friendship Group.

== Scandal about accusations against Gelbhaar under false identity ==
Shortly before the electoral list for the 2025 German federal election had to be finalized in December 2024, within 2 days, the Green party's investigative office received 15 separate accusations of alleged cross-border behaviour and harassment against Gelbhaar. The office passed information regarding the existence of these accusations to the Greens district association and advised them to take action. A day before the Greens candidates for the election had to be announced, the investigative office informed Gelbhaar, who then withdrew his candidature and the Greens replaced him as candidate by Julia Schneider. By this point, shortly before Christmas 2024, German broadcaster RBB made the accusations public.

On 17 January the RBB announced that it would retract all coverage concerning the accusations against Gelbhaar. The next day a woman within the Greens who apparently had voiced some of the most severe accusations of sexual harassment against Gelbhaar under false identity, stepped down from her position and left the Green party. On 21 January 2025, the regional court of Hamburg prohibited RBB from publishing an article that the broadcaster had taken offline yet called in parts admissible reporting. The court ruled that publishing the statements by a supposed witness, which it called "devoid of content", would constitute a violation of personal rights of Gelbhaar. Berlin parliament member Klara Schedlich was one of the anonymous accusers whose statements were used by the RBB for its initial reporting. Gelbhaar brought a case against her in early 2025 before the Regional Court of Hamburg, aiming to forbid her from repeating statements about alleged cross-border behaviour.

An attempt by Gelbhaar to run for office with the Greens again in Berlin-Pankow failed in November 2025, when Suncica Klaas won the vote decisively, cheered by some of the female delegates.

== Other activities ==
- Deutsche Bahn, Member of the Supervisory Board (since 2022)
