= Benedikt Lux =

German politician (born 1981)

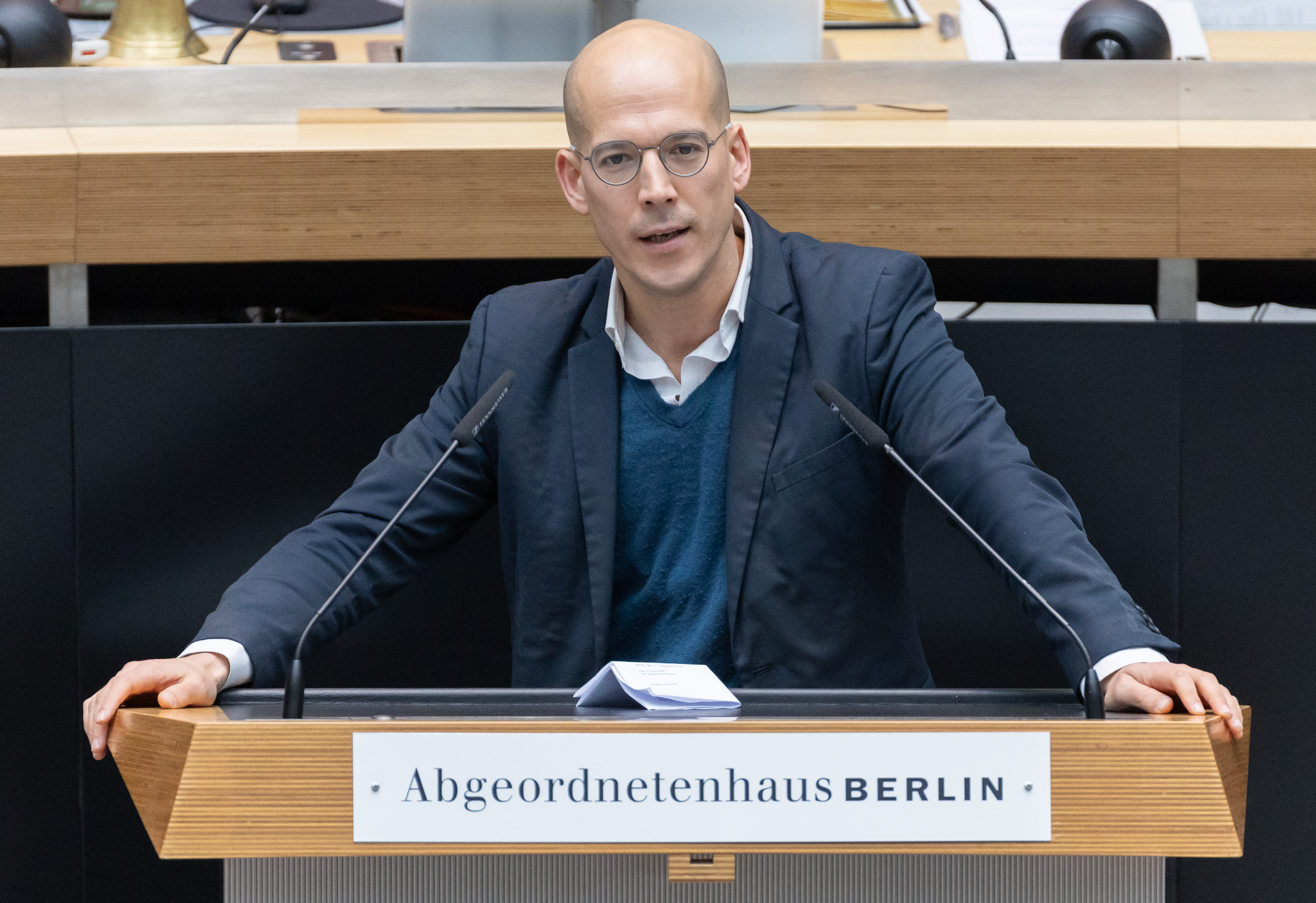
- Lux in 2025

Member of the Berlin House of Representatives
- Incumbent
- Assumed office 14 May 2025
- Preceded by: Julia Schneider
- In office 26 October 2006 – 16 March 2023

Personal details
- Born: 9 December 1981 (age 44) Berlin
- Party: Alliance 90/The Greens

Benedikt Lux (born 9 December 1981) is a German politician. He has been a member of the Berlin House of Representatives since 2025, having previously served from 2006 to 2023. From 2003 to 2004, he served as spokesperson of the Green Youth.
