= List of 7th Heaven episodes =

7th Heaven is an American television drama series created by executive producer Brenda Hampton, and co-executive produced by Aaron Spelling and E. Duke Vincent through Spelling Television. The series revolves around a family headed by parents Eric Camden (Stephen Collins), a Protestant Reverend, and Annie Camden (Catherine Hicks), a homemaker. Their seven children are Matt (Barry Watson), Mary (Jessica Biel), Lucy (Beverley Mitchell), Simon (David Gallagher), Ruthie (Mackenzie Rosman) and twins Sam and David (Nikolas and Lorenzo Brino).

Hampton, in addition to creating the show and serving as its executive producer, wrote multiple 7th Heaven episodes each season. Hampton received writing credits on 114 of the shows 243 episodes.

7th Heaven debuted on August 26, 1996, on The WB, a network which had launched only a year earlier. In November 2005, Variety Magazine announced The WB's decision to cancel the series at the end of the tenth season due to rising production costs. The final episode was intended to air on May 8, 2006, in the final year of The WB's operation before it merged with UPN to form The CW in the fall; however, the episode achieved 7 million viewers, and The CW revived the show, bringing it back to the schedules for its eleventh season on September 25, 2006. The return did not last long; due to flagging viewing figures, The CW made a schedule change midway through the eleventh season, switching 7th Heaven from the Monday 8:00 p.m. timeslot it had occupied since the first episode with Everybody Hates Chris in the Sunday 8:00 p.m. timeslot, and on April 2, 2007, The CW announced its decision to end the series, airing the final episode on May 13, 2007. In all, 243 episodes were produced over eleven seasons.

== Series overview ==
Season	Episodes	Originally released			Average viewership (in millions)
Season	Episodes	First released	Last released	Network	Average viewership (in millions)
1	22	August 26, 1996	May 19, 1997	The WB	3.24
2	22	September 15, 1997	May 11, 1998	The WB	6.10
3	22	September 21, 1998	May 24, 1999	The WB	8.40
4	22	September 20, 1999	May 22, 2000	The WB	7.22
5	22	October 2, 2000	May 21, 2001	The WB	7.66
6	22	September 24, 2001	May 20, 2002	The WB	7.89
7	22	September 16, 2002	May 19, 2003	The WB	8.11
8	23	September 15, 2003	May 17, 2004	The WB	6.67
9	22	September 13, 2004	May 23, 2005	The WB	6.26
10	22	September 19, 2005	May 8, 2006	The WB	5.62
11	22	September 25, 2006	May 13, 2007	The CW	3.44

== Episodes ==
=== Season 1 (1996–97) ===
No. overall	No. in season	Title	Directed by	Written by	Original release date	Prod. code	Viewers (millions)
1	1	"Anything You Want"	Sam Weisman	Brenda Hampton	August 26, 1996	1496003	2.8
2	2	"Family Secrets"	Mark Sobel	Brenda Hampton	September 23, 1996	4296001	2.6
3	3	"In the Blink of an Eye"	Duwayne Dunham	Catherine LePard	September 30, 1996	4296002	2.5
4	4	"No Funerals and a Wedding"	Mark Jean	Molly Newman	October 7, 1996	4296003	2.6
5	5	"The Color of God"	Burt Brinckerhoff	Brenda Hampton	October 14, 1996	4296004	3.1
6	6	"Halloween"	Nick Havinga	Molly Newman	October 28, 1996	4296006	3.6
7	7	"Saturday"	David Semel	Jack LoGiudice	November 4, 1996	4296005	3.6
8	8	"What Will People Say?"	Duwayne Dunham	Brenda Hampton	November 11, 1996	4296007	3.6
9	9	"See No Evil, Hear No Evil, Speak No Evil"	Harry Harris	Catherine LePard	November 18, 1996	4296008	3.1
10	10	"The Last Call for Aunt Julie"	Joel J. Feigenbaum	Ron Zimmerman	November 25, 1996	4296009	3.6
11	11	"Now You See Me"	Harvey S. Laidman	Charles Lazer	December 16, 1996	4296010	3.2
12	12	"With a Little Help from my Friends"	Burt Brinckerhoff	Brenda Hampton & Jack LoGiudice	January 13, 1997	4296011	3.02
13	13	"America's Most Wanted"	Mark Jean	Brenda Hampton	January 27, 1997	4296013	3.21
14	14	"Seven is Enough"	Harry Harris	Catherine LePard & Ron Zimmerman	February 3, 1997	4296012	3.17
15	15	"Happy's Valentine"	David Semel	Brenda Hampton	February 10, 1997	4296014	3.84
16	16	"Brave New World"	Harvey S. Laidman	Catherine LePard	February 17, 1997	4296015	4.02
17	17	"Choices"	Kevin Inch	Sue Tenney	April 14, 1997	4296016	3.56
18	18	"Faith, Hope and the Bottom Line"	Burt Brinckerhoff	Catherine LePard	April 21, 1997	4296017	2.72
19	19	"It's About George"	Harry Harris	Ron Zimmerman	April 28, 1997	4296018	3.05
20	20	"Say Good-Bye"	Gabrielle Beaumont	Brenda Hampton & Sue Tenney	May 5, 1997	4296019	2.93
21	21	"Dangerous Liaisons" (Part 1)	Harvey S. Laidman	Teleplay by : Brenda Hampton & Ron Zimmerman; Story by : Brenda Hampton	May 12, 1997	4296020	3.26
22	22	"Dangerous Liaisons" (Part 2)	Harvey S. Laidman	Teleplay by : Brenda Hampton & Catherine LePard; Story by : Brenda Hampton	May 19, 1997	4296021	4.15

=== Season 2 (1997–98) ===
No. overall	No. in season	Title	Directed by	Written by	Original release date	Prod. code	Viewers (millions)
23	1	"Don't Take My Love Away"	Burt Brinckerhoff	Brenda Hampton	September 15, 1997	01496022	4.63
24	2	"See You in September"	David Semel	Story by : Brenda Hampton; Teleplay by : Christopher Bird	September 22, 1997	01496023	4.77
25	3	"I Love You"	Gabrielle Beaumont	Brenda Hampton	September 29, 1997	01496024	4.86
26	4	"Who Knew?"	Gabrielle Beaumont	Greg Plageman	October 6, 1997	01496025	5.49
27	5	"Says Who?"	Harvey Laidman	Greg Plageman	October 13, 1997	01496026	5.60
28	6	"Breaking Up Is Hard to Do"	Harry Harris	Brenda Hampton	October 20, 1997	01496027	5.40
29	7	"Girls Just Want to Have Fun"	Joel J. Feigenbaum	Catherine LePard	November 3, 1997	01496028	5.97
30	8	"Do Something"	Tony Mordente	Naomi Janzen	November 10, 1997	01496029	5.42
31	9	"I Hate You"	Burt Brinckerhoff	Brenda Hampton & Eleah Horwitz	November 17, 1997	01496030	7.53
32	10	"Truth or Dare"	Les Sheldon	Brenda Hampton & Eleah Horwitz	November 24, 1997	01496031	5.73
33	11	"Lead, Follow, or Get Out of the Way"	Les Sheldon	Greg Plageman	January 12, 1998	01496032	6.15
34	12	"Rush to Judgment"	Neema Barnette	Cristopher Bird	January 19, 1998	01496033	7.17
35	13	"Stuck in the Middle with You"	Harry Harris	Brenda Hampton	January 26, 1998	01496034	6.25
36	14	"Red Tape"	Les Sheldon	Brenda Hampton	February 2, 1998	01496035	6.56
37	15	"Homecoming"	David J. Plenn	Catherine LePard	February 9, 1998	01496036	5.96
38	16	"It Takes a Village"	Burt Brinckerhoff	Sue Tenney	February 23, 1998	01496037	6.18
39	17	"Nothing Endures But Change"	Stephen Collins	Heather Conkie	March 2, 1998	01496038	7.67
40	18	"My Kind of Guy"	Joseph B. Wallenstein	Greg Plageman	April 6, 1998	01496039	5.66
41	19	"Time to Leave the Nest"	Tony Mordente	Stephanie Simpson	April 13, 1998	01496040	5.69
42	20	"Like a Harlot"	Joel J. Feigenbaum	Sue Tenney	April 27, 1998	01496041	6.08
43	21	"Boyfriends…" (Part 1)	Burt Brinckerhoff	Brenda Hampton	May 4, 1998	01496042	6.18
44	22	"…and Girlfriends" (Part 2)	Burt Brinckerhoff	Catherine LePard	May 11, 1998	01496043	9.33

=== Season 3 (1998–99) ===
No. overall	No. in season	Title	Directed by	Written by	Original release date	Prod. code	Viewers (millions)
45	1	"It Takes Two, Baby"	Burt Brinckerhoff	Brenda Hampton	September 21, 1998	04298044	6.29
46	2	"Drunk Like Me"	Joel J. Feigenbaum	Carol Evan McKeand & Nigel McKeand	September 28, 1998	04298045	6.49
47	3	"Cutters"	Anson Williams	Sue Tenney	October 5, 1998	04298047	7.55
48	4	"The Legacy"	Tony Mordente	Catherine LePard	October 12, 1998	04298046	6.73
49	5	"... And a Nice Chianti"	Harvey S. Laidman	Greg Plageman	October 19, 1998	04298048	6.10
50	6	"And the Home of the Brave"	Harry Harris	Brenda Hampton	November 2, 1998	04298049	6.67
51	7	"Johnny Get Your Gun"	Kevin Inch	Brenda Hampton	November 9, 1998	04298050	9.13
52	8	"No Sex, Some Drugs and a Little Rock 'n' Roll"	David J. Plenn	Sue Tenney	November 16, 1998	04298051	8.24
53	9	"Let's Talk About Sex"	Tony Mordente	Brenda Hampton	November 23, 1998	04298052	8.19
54	10	"Here Comes Santa Claus"	Joel J. Feigenbaum	Chris Olsen & Jeff Olsen	December 14, 1998	04298053	8.52
55	11	"Nobody Knows..."	Harry Harris	Brenda Hampton & Catherine LePard	January 11, 1999	04298054	7.42
56	12	"All That Jazz"	Harvey Laidman	Sue Tenney	January 18, 1999	04298055	7.94
57	13	"The Tribes That Bind"	Bradley Gross	Catherine LePard	January 25, 1999	04298056	9.48
58	14	"In Praise of Women"	Burt Brinckerhoff	Brenda Hampton & Sue Tenney	February 8, 1999	04298057	12.51
59	15	"It Happened One Night"	Tony Mordente	Brenda Hampton & Greg Plageman	February 15, 1999	04298058	10.65
60	16	"Paranoia"	Stephen Collins	Ron Darian	February 22, 1999	04298059	10.30
61	17	"Sometimes That's Just the Way It Is"	Kevin Inch	Linda Ptolemy	March 1, 1999	04298060	10.01
62	18	"We the People"	Harry Harris	Catherine LePard	March 15, 1999	04298061	9.93
63	19	"The Voice"	David J. Plenn	Ron Darian	May 3, 1999	04298062	7.19
64	20	"All Dogs Go to Heaven"	Paul Snider	Chris Olsen & Jeff Olsen	May 10, 1999	04298063	7.50
65	21	"There Goes the Bride: Part 1"	Burt Brinckerhoff	Teleplay by : Brenda Hampton & Sue Tenney; Story by : Sue Tenney	May 17, 1999	04298064	8.33
66	22	"There Goes the Bride: Part 2"	Burt Brinckerhoff	Teleplay by : Brenda Hampton & Sue Tenney; Story by : Sue Tenney	May 24, 1999	04298065	9.60

=== Season 4 (1999–2000) ===
No. overall	No. in season	Title	Directed by	Written by	Original release date	Prod. code	Viewers (millions)
67	1	"The Tattle Tale Heart"	Burt Brinckerhoff	Brenda Hampton	September 20, 1999	04299066	8.67
68	2	"Life is Too Beautiful"	Tony Mordente	Brenda Hampton	September 27, 1999	04299067	8.32
69	3	"Yak Sada"	Bradley Gross	Elizabeth Orange	October 4, 1999	04299068	7.60
70	4	"Come Drive With Me"	Anson Williams	Ron Darian	October 11, 1999	04299069	7.44
71	5	"With Honors"	Harvey Laidman	Sue Tenney	October 18, 1999	04299070	7.81
72	6	"Just You Wait and See"	Paul Snider	Linda Ptolemy	October 25, 1999	04299073	7.44
73	7	"Sin…" (Part 1)	Tony Mordente	Catherine LePard	November 8, 1999	04299071	6.87
74	8	"…And Expiation" (Part 2)	Tony Mordente	Catherine LePard	November 15, 1999	04299072	8.11
75	9	"Dirty Laundry"	Burt Brinckerhoff	Elaine Arata	November 22, 1999	04299074	6.79
76	10	"Who Nose"	Harvey Laidman	Suzanne Fitzpatrick	November 29, 1999	04299075	9.04
77	11	"Forget Me Not"	David J. Plenn	Sue Tenney	December 13, 1999	04299076	6.43
78	12	"All By Myself"	Kevin Inch	Brenda Hampton & Sue Tenney	January 24, 2000	04299077	6.91
79	13	"Who Do You Trust?"	Joel J. Feigenbaum	Ron Darian & Brenda Hampton	January 31, 2000	04299078	8.97
80	14	"Words"	Burt Brinckerhoff	Sue Tenney	February 7, 2000	04299079	7.17
81	15	"Loves Me, Loves Me Not"	Bradley Gross	Brenda Hampton	February 14, 2000	04299080	6.95
82	16	"Say a Little Prayer for Me"	Harry Harris	Brenda Hampton	February 21, 2000	04299081	7.07
83	17	"Twelve Angry People"	Tony Mordente	Carol Tenney	February 28, 2000	04299082	6.49
84	18	"Hoop Dreams"	David J. Plenn	Jon Bastian	April 10, 2000	04299083	5.99
85	19	"Talk to Me"	Tony Mordente	Elaine Arata	May 1, 2000	04299084	4.69
86	20	"Liar, Liar"	Paul Snider	Brenda Hampton	May 8, 2000	04299085	5.71
87	21	"Love Stinks" (Part 1)	Burt Brinckerhoff	Sue Tenney	May 15, 2000	04299086	6.94
88	22	"Love Stinks" (Part 2)	Burt Brinckerhoff	Sue Tenney	May 22, 2000	04299087	7.43

=== Season 5 (2000–01) ===
No. overall	No. in season	Title	Directed by	Written by	Original release date	Prod. code	Viewers (millions)
89	1	"Here We Go Again"	Burt Brinckerhoff	Brenda Hampton	October 2, 2000	6200605-089	6.93
90	2	"Help"	Tony Mordente	Sue Tenney	October 9, 2000	6200605-090	6.92
91	3	"Losers"	Harvey Laidman	Brenda Hampton	October 16, 2000	6200605-091	6.95
92	4	"Busted"	Tony Mordente	Brenda Hampton	October 23, 2000	6200605-092	8.10
93	5	"Blind"	Burt Brinckerhoff	Sue Tenney	October 30, 2000	6200605-093	7.23
94	6	"Broke"	Joel J. Feigenbaum	Brenda Hampton & Sue Tenney	November 6, 2000	6200605-094	9.12
95	7	"Bye"	Paul Snider	Brenda Hampton & Sue Tenney	November 13, 2000	6200605-095	10.42
96	8	"Gossip"	Chip Chalmers	Sue Tenney	November 20, 2000	6200605-096	8.82
97	9	"Tunes"	Tony Mordente	Brenda Hampton	November 27, 2000	6200605-097	8.85
98	10	"Surprise!"	Bradley Gross	Chris Olsen	December 18, 2000	6200605-098	8.02
99	11	"Home"	Harvey Laidman	Jeff Olsen	January 22, 2001	6200605-099	7.43
100	12	"One Hundred"	David J. Plenn	Sue Tenney	January 29, 2001	6200605-100	8.78
101	13	"Kiss"	Tony Mordente	Brenda Hampton & Sue Tenney	February 5, 2001	6200605-101	7.23
102	14	"V-Day"	Burt Brinckerhoff	Carol Tenney	February 12, 2001	6200605-102	6.35
103	15	"Sweeps"	Joel J. Feigenbaum	Brenda Hampton	February 19, 2001	6200605-103	7.95
104	16	"Parents"	Tony Mordente	Sue Tenney	February 26, 2001	6200605-104	7.95
105	17	"Crazy"	Joel J. Feigenbaum	Teleplay by : Chris Olsen & Jeff Olsen; Story by : Brenda Hampton	April 16, 2001	6200605-105	6.57
106	18	"Apologize"	Harry Harris	Teleplay by : Chris Olsen & Jeff Olsen; Story by : Brenda Hampton	April 23, 2001	6200605-106	6.54
107	19	"Virgin"	Chip Chalmers	Brenda Hampton	April 30, 2001	6200605-107	6.13
108	20	"Regrets"	Tony Mordente	Barbara Calloway & Brenda Hampton	May 7, 2001	6200605-108	6.97
109	21	"Chances... (Part 1)"	Burt Brinckerhoff	Sue Tenney	May 14, 2001	6200605-109	7.27
110	22	"...Are (Part 2)"	Burt Brinckerhoff	Sue Tenney	May 21, 2001	6200605-110	8.09

=== Season 6 (2001–02) ===
No. overall	No. in season	Title	Directed by	Written by	Original release date	Prod. code	Viewers (millions)
111	1	"Changes"	Burt Brinckerhoff	Brenda Hampton	September 24, 2001	62006-06-111	8.34
112	2	"Teased"	Tony Mordente	Brenda Hampton	October 1, 2001	62006-06-112	8.52
113	3	"Sympathy"	Joel J. Feigenbaum	Brenda Hampton	October 8, 2001	62006-06-113	8.68
114	4	"Work"	David J. Plenn	Sue Tenney	October 15, 2001	62006-06-114	9.28
115	5	"Relationships"	Burt Brinckerhoff	Sue Tenney	October 22, 2001	62006-06-115	8.25
116	6	"Broken"	Tony Mordente	Sue Tenney	November 5, 2001	62006-06-116	7.84
117	7	"Prodigal"	Harry Harris	Brenda Hampton & Erik Kolbell	November 12, 2001	62006-06-117	8.58
118	8	"Ay Carumba"	Paul Snider	Brenda Hampton	November 19, 2001	62006-06-118	8.29
119	9	"Lost"	Burt Brinckerhoff	Story by : Chris Olsen & Jeff Olsen; Teleplay by : Brenda Hampton	November 26, 2001	62006-06-119	7.91
120	10	"Consideration"	Tony Mordente	Sue Tenney	December 10, 2001	62006-06-120	7.22
121	11	"Pathetic"	Bradley Gross	Brenda Hampton & Jeffrey Rodgers	January 14, 2002	62006-06-121	6.95
122	12	"Suspicion"	Joel J. Feigenbaum	Elaine Arata	January 21, 2002	62006-06-122	8.05
123	13	"Drunk"	Burt Brinckerhoff	Sue Tenney	February 4, 2002	62006-06-123	8.43
124	14	"Hot Pants"	Tony Mordente	Sue Tenney	February 11, 2002	62006-06-124	7.26
125	15	"I Really Do" (Part 1)	Burt Brinckerhoff	Brenda Hampton	February 25, 2002	62006-06-125	7.83
126	16	"I Really Did" (Part 2)	Stephen Collins	Brenda Hampton	March 4, 2002	62006-06-126	8.25
127	17	"Lip Service"	Joel J. Feigenbaum	Paul Perlove	April 15, 2002	62006-06-127	6.70
128	18	"The Ring"	Tony Mordente	Sue Tenney & Chad Byrnes	April 22, 2002	62006-06-128	6.87
129	19	"Letting Go"	Joel J. Feigenbaum	Brenda Hampton	April 29, 2002	62006-06-129	6.89
130	20	"The Known Soldier"	Burt Brinckerhoff	Brenda Hampton	May 6, 2002	62006-06-130	7.67
131	21	"Holy War: Part 1"	Tony Mordente	Sue Tenney	May 13, 2002	62006-06-131	7.42
132	22	"Holy War: Part 2"	Tony Mordente	Sue Tenney	May 20, 2002	62006-06-132	8.38

=== Season 7 (2002–03) ===
No. overall	No. in season	Title	Directed by	Written by	Original release date	Prod. code	Viewers (millions)
133	1	"Monkey Business (Part 1)"	Tony Mordente	Brenda Hampton	September 16, 2002	62006-07-133	9.16
134	2	"Monkey Business Deux (Part 2)"	Joel J. Feigenbaum	Brenda Hampton	September 23, 2002	62006-07-134	7.90
135	3	"The Enemy Within"	Harry Harris	Brenda Hampton	September 30, 2002	62006-07-135	8.47
136	4	"Bowling for Eric"	Tony Mordente	Sue Tenney	October 7, 2002	62006-07-136	8.61
137	5	"The Heart of The Matter"	Tony Mordente	Sue Tenney	October 14, 2002	62006-07-137	8.93
138	6	"Regarding Eric"	Joel J. Feigenbaum	Sue Tenney	October 21, 2002	62006-07-138	8.45
139	7	"Gabrielle Come Blow Your Horn"	Tony Mordente	Brenda Hampton	November 4, 2002	62006-07-139	8.54
140	8	"Peer Pressure"	Bradley Gross	Barry Watson	November 11, 2002	62006-07-140	7.80
141	9	"Lost Souls"	Harry Harris	Brenda Hampton	November 18, 2002	62006-07-141	8.81
142	10	"A Cry for Help"	Tony Mordente	Sue Tenney	November 25, 2002	62006-07-142	9.06
143	11	"Sunday"	Joel J. Feigenbaum	Brenda Hampton	January 6, 2003	62006-07-143	6.85
144	12	"Back in the Saddle"	Tony Mordente	Brenda Hampton	January 20, 2003	62006-07-144	7.54
145	13	"It's Not Always About You"	Joel J. Feigenbaum	Lawrence H. Levy	January 27, 2003	62006-07-145	7.12
146	14	"Smoking"	Tony Mordente	Sue Tenney	February 3, 2003	62006-07-146	8.38
147	15	"I Love Lucy"	Joel J. Feigenbaum	Brenda Hampton	February 10, 2003	62006-07-147	9.27
148	16	"Stand Up"	Lynn Harris	Sue Tenney	February 17, 2003	62006-07-148	8.34
149	17	"High Anxiety"	Joel J. Feigenbaum	Sue Tenney	February 24, 2003	62006-07-149	8.24
150	18	"We Do"	Tony Mordente	Brenda Hampton	April 21, 2003	62006-07-150	8.28
151	19	"That Touch of Bink" (Part 1)	Joel J. Feigenbaum	Brenda Hampton	April 28, 2003	62006-07-151	6.47
152	20	"Dick" (Part 2)	Joel J. Feigenbaum & Harry Harris	Brenda Hampton & Jeffrey Rodgers	May 5, 2003	62006-07-152	6.77
153	21	"Life and Death" (Part 1)	Tony Mordente	Brenda Hampton, Chris Olsen & Jeff Olsen	May 12, 2003	62006-07-153	7.05
154	22	"Life and Death" (Part 2)	Tony Mordente	Brenda Hampton, Chris Olsen & Jeff Olsen	May 19, 2003	62006-07-154	8.28

=== Season 8 (2003–04) ===
No. overall	No. in season	Title	Directed by	Written by	Original release date	Prod. code	Viewers (millions)
155	1	"The Long Bad Summer" (Part 1)	Joel J. Feigenbaum	Brenda Hampton	September 15, 2003	62006-08-155	8.08
156	2	"An Early Fall" (Part 2)	Joel J. Feigenbaum	Brenda Hampton	September 22, 2003	62006-08-156	8.69
157	3	"PK (Preacher's Kid)"	Harry Harris	Brenda Hampton	September 29, 2003	62006-08-157	7.24
158	4	"I Wasn't Expecting That!"	David Jones	Paul Perlove	October 6, 2003	62006-08-158	7.41
159	5	"Simon's Home Video" a.k.a. "The Kid Is Out of the Picture"	Deborah Raffin	Chris Olsen & Jeff Olsen	October 13, 2003	62006-08-159	6.81
160	6	"Charity Begins at Home"	Karen Arthur	Sue Tenney	October 20, 2003	62006-08-160	7.15
161	7	"Getting to Know You"	Harry Harris	Sue Tenney	November 3, 2003	62006-08-161	6.79
162	8	"Baggage"	Harvey Laidman	Sue Tenney	November 10, 2003	62006-08-162	6.87
163	9	"Go Ask Alice"	Joel J. Feigenbaum	Brenda Hampton & Shawn Kostanian	November 17, 2003	62006-08-163	7.85
164	10	"The One Thing"	Fred Einesman	Fred Einesman	November 24, 2003	62006-08-164	7.54
165	11	"When Bad Conversations Happen to Good People"	Harry Harris	Brenda Hampton	January 5, 2004	62006-08-165	6.31
166	12	"The Prodigal Father"	Harvey Laidman	Brenda Hampton	January 12, 2004	62006-08-166	5.87
167	13	"Major League"	Joel J. Feigenbaum	Sue Tenney	January 19, 2004	62006-08-167	5.54
168	14	"Healing Old Wounds"	Harry Harris	Brenda Hampton	January 26, 2004	62006-08-168	6.43
169	15	"Don't Speak Ill of the Dead or the Living"	Joel J. Feigenbaum	Brenda Hampton	February 9, 2004	62006-08-169	6.11
170	16	"The Anniversary"	Deborah Raffin	Sue Tenney	February 16, 2004	62006-08-170	6.08
171	17	"Two Weddings, an Engagement, and a Funeral"	Harry Harris	Sue Tenney	February 23, 2004	62006-08-171	6.00
172	18	"Angel"	Peter Medak	Brenda Hampton	March 1, 2004	62006-08-172	5.46
173	19	"There's No Place Like It"	Joel J. Feigenbaum	Elaine Arata	April 19, 2004	62006-08-173	5.55
174	20	"High and Dry"	Harry Harris	Jeffrey Rodgers	April 26, 2004	62006-08-174	6.23
175	21	"Lost and Found"	Harvey Laidman	Paul Perlove	May 3, 2004	62006-08-175	6.07
176	22	"Little White Lies" (Part 1)	Joel J. Feigenbaum	Sue Tenney	May 10, 2004	62006-08-176	6.49
177	23	"Little White Lies" (Part 2)	Joel J. Feigenbaum	Sue Tenney	May 17, 2004	62006-08-177	6.86

=== Season 9 (2004–05) ===
No. overall	No. in season	Title	Directed by	Written by	Original release date	Prod. code	Viewers (millions)
178	1	"Dropping Trou" (Part 1)	Joel J. Feigenbaum	Brenda Hampton	September 13, 2004	62006-09-178	7.26
179	2	"The Best Laid Plans" (Part 2)	Harry Harris	Brenda Hampton	September 20, 2004	62006-09-179	6.65
180	3	"The Song of Lucy"	Joel J. Feigenbaum	Sue Tenney	September 27, 2004	62006-09-180	6.53
181	4	"Bad Boys, Bad Boys, Whatcha Gonna Do?"	Michael Preece	Elaine Arata	October 4, 2004	62006-09-181	7.36
182	5	"Vote"	Joel J. Feigenbaum	Chris Olsen	October 11, 2004	62006-09-182	5.87
183	6	"Fathers"	Harry Harris	Jeff Olsen	October 18, 2004	62006-09-183	6.61
184	7	"Regret to Inform"	Harvey Laidman	Jeffrey Rodgers	October 25, 2004	62006-09-184	6.62
185	8	"Why Not Me?"	Joel J. Feigenbaum	Sue Tenney	November 1, 2004	62006-09-185	6.51
186	9	"Thanksgiving"	Harry Harris	Sue Tenney	November 15, 2004	62006-09-186	6.71
187	10	"Gratitude"	Fred Einesman	Fred Einesman	November 22, 2004	62006-09-187	7.52
188	11	"Wayne's World"	Joel J. Feigenbaum	Sue Tenney	November 29, 2004	62006-09-188	6.88
189	12	"Paper or Plastic?"	Michael Preece	Brenda Hampton & Jeffrey Rodgers	January 24, 2005	62006-09-189	7.99
190	13	"The Fine Art of Parenting"	Harry Harris	Teleplay by : Justin Trofholz; Story by : Brenda Hampton	January 31, 2005	62006-09-190	6.64
191	14	"First Date"	Joel J. Feigenbaum	Courtney Turk & Kelley Turk	February 7, 2005	62006-09-191	6.91
192	15	"Red Socks"	Michael Preece	Martha Plimpton	February 14, 2005	62006-09-192	5.10
193	16	"Brotherly Love"	Barry Watson	Brenda Hampton	February 21, 2005	62006-09-193	5.50
194	17	"Tangled Web We Weave"	Joel J. Feigenbaum	Brenda Hampton	February 28, 2005	62006-09-194	5.57
195	18	"Honor Thy Mother"	Harry Harris	Victoria Huff	April 25, 2005	62006-09-195	5.35
196	19	"Hungry"	Joel J. Feigenbaum	Elaine Arata	May 2, 2005	62006-09-196	4.89
197	20	"Leaps of Faith"	Ron High	Jeffrey Rodgers	May 9, 2005	62006-09-197	4.76
198	21	"Mi Familia" (Part 1)	Joel J. Feigenbaum	Sue Tenney	May 16, 2005	62006-09-198	4.91
199	22	"Mi Familia" (Part 2)	Joel J. Feigenbaum	Sue Tenney	May 23, 2005	62006-09-199	5.54

=== Season 10 (2005–06) ===
No. overall	No. in season	Title	Directed by	Written by	Original release date	Prod. code	Viewers (millions)
200	1	"It's Late"	Harry Harris	Brenda Hampton	September 19, 2005	62006-10-200	5.42
201	2	"Home Run"	Harry Harris	Brenda Hampton & Chris Olsen	September 26, 2005	62006-10-201	5.04
202	3	"Mama's Gonna Buy You a Diamond Ring"	Joel J. Feigenbaum	Brenda Hampton & Chris Olsen	October 3, 2005	62006-10-202	5.34
203	4	"Ring Around the Rosie"	Joel J. Feigenbaum	Elaine Arata & Brenda Hampton	October 10, 2005	62006-10-203	5.26
204	5	"The Rat's Out of the Bag"	Barry Watson	Brenda Hampton & Jeffrey Rodgers	October 17, 2005	62006-10-204	5.32
205	6	"Helpful"	Harry Harris	Brenda Hampton, Courtney Turk & Kelley Turk	October 31, 2005	62006-10-205	5.29
206	7	"Soup's On"	Joel J. Feigenbaum	Brenda Hampton & Victoria Huff	November 7, 2005	62006-10-206	5.62
207	8	"Chicken Noodle Heads"	Keith Truesdell	Brenda Hampton & Chris Olsen	November 14, 2005	62006-10-207	5.81
208	9	"Turkey"	Michael Preece	Brenda Hampton & Jeff Olsen	November 21, 2005	62006-10-208	6.26
209	10	"Apple Pie"	Lindsley Parsons III	Brenda Hampton & Jeffrey Rodgers	November 28, 2005	62006-10-209	5.93
210	11	"X-Mas"	Harry Harris	Brenda Hampton & Jeffrey Rodgers	December 12, 2005	62006-10-210	6.48
211	12	"Got MLK?"	Joel J. Feigenbaum	Orlando Bishop, Kevin Brownridge & Damani Mangum	January 23, 2006	62006-10-211	5.21
212	13	"And Baby Makes Three"	Michael Preece	Lawrence H. Levy	January 30, 2006	62006-10-212	6.28
213	14	"The Magic of Gershwin"	Harry Harris	Paul Perlove	February 6, 2006	62006-10-213	5.89
214	15	"Love and Obsession"	Ron High	Lawrence H. Levy	February 13, 2006	62006-10-214	5.89
215	16	"Moving Ahead"	Joel J. Feigenbaum	Paul Perlove	February 27, 2006	62006-10-215	5.71
216	17	"Highway to Cell"	Michael Preece	Chad Byrnes	April 3, 2006	62006-10-216	4.61
217	18	"Invitation to Disaster"	Keith Truesdell	Justin Trofholz	April 10, 2006	62006-10-217	4.99
218	19	"Secrets"	Harry Harris	Brenda Hampton & Jeffrey Rodgers	April 17, 2006	62006-10-218	4.85
219	20	"And More Secrets"	Joel J. Feigenbaum	Brenda Hampton, Chris Olsen & Jeff Olsen	April 24, 2006	62006-10-219	5.28
220	21	"Goodbye…" (Part 1)	Michael Preece	Brenda Hampton	May 1, 2006	62006-10-220	5.66
221	22	"…And Thank You" (Part 2)	Michael Preece	Brenda Hampton	May 8, 2006	62006-10-221	7.56

=== Season 11 (2006–07) ===
No. overall	No. in season	Title	Directed by	Written by	Original release date	Prod. code	Viewers (millions)
222	1	"Turn, Turn, Turn"	Joel J. Feigenbaum	Caroline Kepnes	September 25, 2006	62006-11-222	4.19
223	2	"And Tonight's Specials Are…"	Keith Truesdell	Brenda Hampton	October 2, 2006	62006-11-223	4.17
224	3	"A Pain in the Neck"	Michael Preece	Brenda Hampton	October 15, 2006	62006-11-224	3.17
225	4	"Don't Ax, Don't Tell"	Joel J. Feigenbaum	Brenda Hampton	October 22, 2006	62006-11-225	3.27
226	5	"The Replacements"	Michael McDonald	Brenda Hampton	October 29, 2006	62006-11-226	3.14
227	6	"Broken Hearts and Promises"	Michael Preece	Brenda Hampton	November 5, 2006	62006-11-227	3.85
228	7	"You Take the High Road…" (Part 1)	Joel J. Feigenbaum	Jeffrey Rodgers	November 12, 2006	62006-11-228	3.62
229	8	"…And I'll Take the Low Road" (Part 2)	Joel J. Feigenbaum	Brenda Hampton	November 19, 2006	62006-11-229	4.51
230	9	"Thanks and Giving"	Keith Truesdell	Brenda Hampton	November 26, 2006	62006-11-230	4.22
231	10	"You Don't Know What You've Got 'Til He's Gone"	Harry Harris	Story by : Brenda Hampton; Teleplay by : Jeffrey Rodgers	December 3, 2006	62006-11-231	4.23
232	11	"Christmas!"	Keith Truesdell	Elaine Arata & Brenda Hampton	December 10, 2006	62006-11-232	4.39
233	12	"Can I Just Get Something to Eat?"	Harry Harris	Teleplay by : Chris Olsen & Jeff Olsen; Story by : Brenda Hampton	January 14, 2007	62006-11-233	3.13
234	13	"Script Number Two Hundred Thirty-Four"	Joel J. Feigenbaum	Caroline Kepnes	January 21, 2007	62006-11-234	3.33
235	14	"Deacon Blues"	Michael Preece	Jeffrey Rodgers	January 28, 2007	62006-11-235	3.16
236	15	"Tit for Tat"	Lindsley Parsons III	Chris Olsen & Jeff Olsen	February 11, 2007	62006-11-236	2.90
237	16	"Gimme That Ol' Time Religion"	Joel J. Feigenbaum	Chris Olsen & Jeff Olsen	February 18, 2007	62006-11-237	3.57
238	17	"Small Miracles"	Michael Preece	Elaine Arata	April 8, 2007	62006-11-238	2.15
239	18	"Inked"	Keith Truesdell	Chad Bynes	April 15, 2007	62006-11-239	2.80
240	19	"Some Break-Ups and Some Get-Togethers"	Jason Priestley	Justin Trofholz	April 22, 2007	62006-11-240	2.79
241	20	"Nothing Says Lovin' Like Something From the Oven"	Joel J. Feigenbaum	Story by : Brenda Hampton; Teleplay by : Hrag Gaboudian	April 29, 2007	62006-11-241	2.96
242	21	"Good News for Almost Everyone"	Keith Truesdell	Brenda Hampton	May 6, 2007	62006-11-242	2.91
243	22	"And Away We Go"	Harry Harris	Brenda Hampton	May 13, 2007	62006-11-243	3.32
