= Hillary Frey =

American journalist

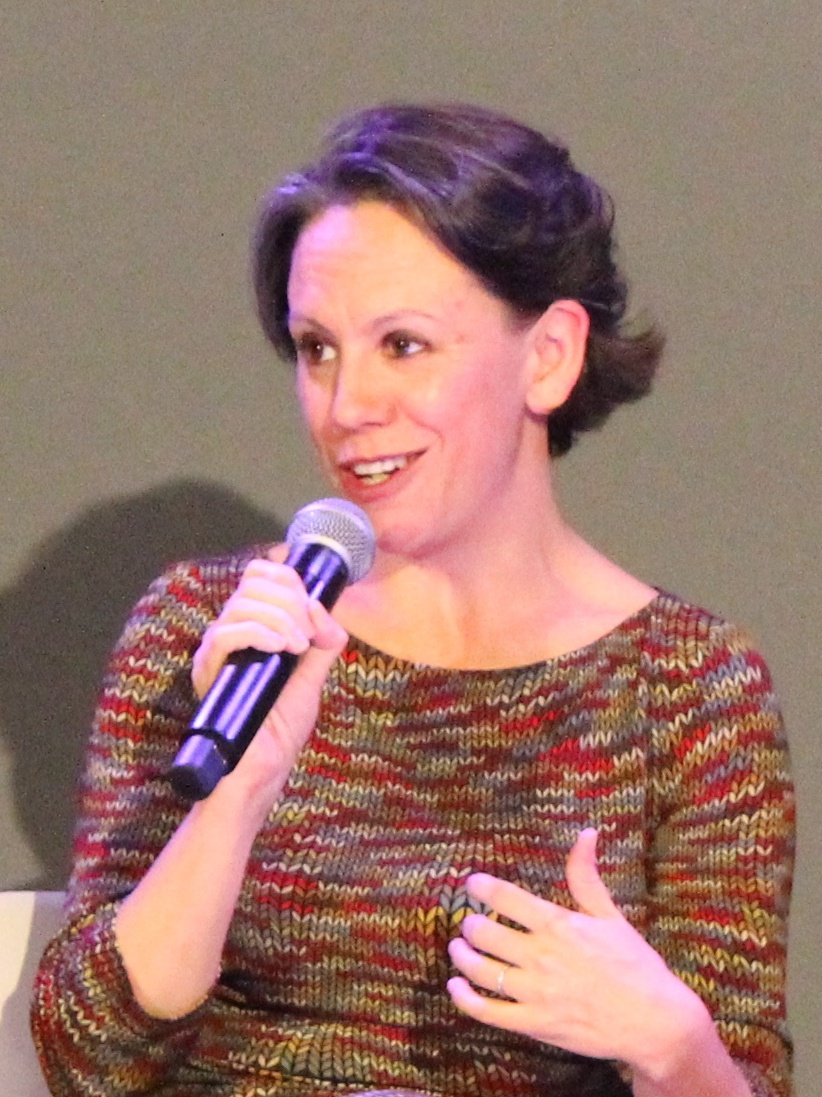
- Frey in October 2015
- Occupations: journalist; editor
- Employer: Slate
- Spouse: Stefan Liebich
- Children: 1

Hillary Frey is an American journalist. Since June 6, 2022, she has served as the current editor-in-chief of the online magazine Slate.

== Career ==
Frey initially worked as a literary agent in New York City. After working in advertisement for the magazine Lingua Franca, she was hired as an editorial assistant for the publication. Frey later served as an editor for The Nation, Salon.com, The New York Observer, and Politico.

In Fall 2010, Frey was hired as managing editor of Adweek. She left the publication to become managing editor of Yahoo News in October 2011, later becoming its editor-in-chief a year later. She left the position to serve as editorial director of NBCNews.com in April 2013. In December 2014, she became the Director of Global News Operations at Fusion, later becoming its executive editor.

In 2016, Medium's magazine, Matter, was spun off into its own studio, Matter Studios. Frey and her then-husband, Mark Lotto, served together as co-creative officers of the new studio.

In 2017, Frey became director of editorial strategy at HuffPost. She then served as its executive editor. In 2021, after Lydia Polgreen resigned as editor-in-chief, Frey was responsible for leading the newsroom at HuffPost. She resigned in September 2021 during a wave of layoffs after the outlet was acquired by Verizon.

She was appointed as a creator in residence on October 18, 2021 in the Newmark School of Journalism at City University of New York. She later graduated from the school's executive program a year later.

She serves the current editor-in-chief of the online magazine Slate since June 6, 2022.

== Personal life ==
Frey's ex-husband, Mark Lotto, served as a senior GQ editor in 2011 and as a creative officer for Matter Studios in 2016. As of 2024, she resided in Brooklyn alongside her daughter and husband, Stefan Liebich.
