= Gottfried Ludewig =

German politician (born 1982)

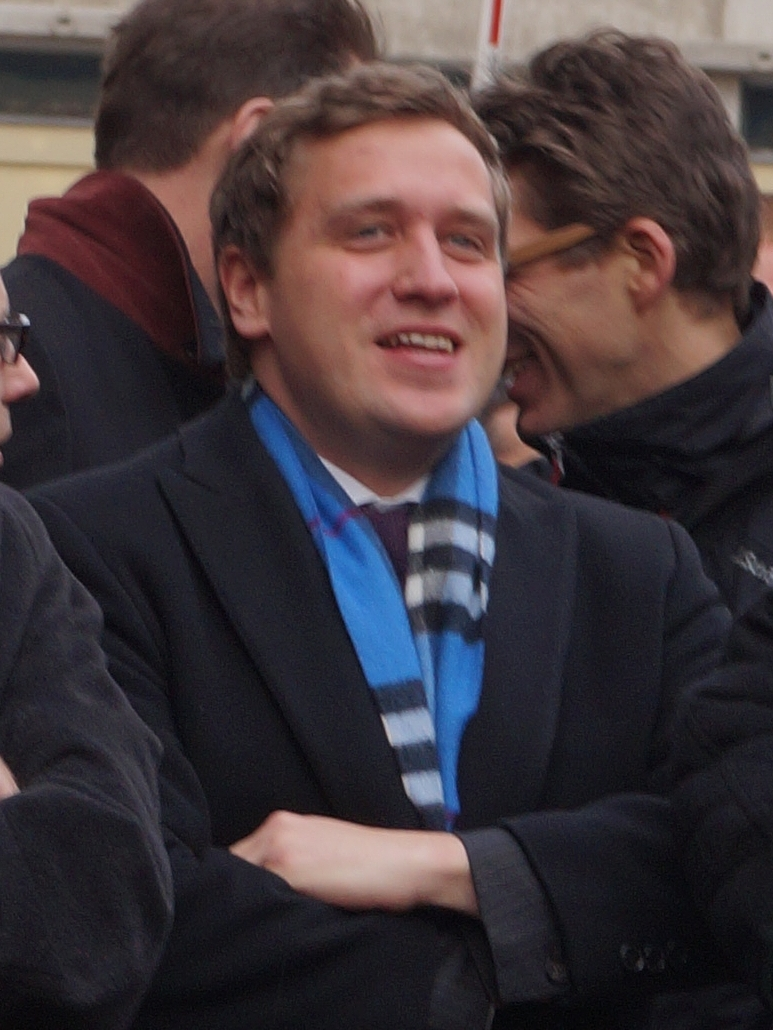
- Ludewig in 2018

Member of the Berlin House of Representatives
- In office 27 October 2011 – 6 April 2018
- Succeeded by: Dirk Stettner
- Constituency: Pankow

Personal details
- Born: 20 October 1982 (age 43)
- Party: Christian Democratic Union (since 2007)

Gottfried Ludewig (born 20 October 1982) is a German politician. From 2011 to 2018, he was a member of the Berlin House of Representatives. From 2008 to 2010, he served as chairman of the Association of Christian Democratic Students.
