= Slatest =

News blog

Slatest, also known as The Slatest, is a news blog that has been published by Slate since 2009, when it was launched to replace their 12-years-old "Today's Papers" feature. It also replaced Slate's magazine aggregator feature "In Other Magazines". In 2011, the website was redesigned; the effects included making its homepage more closely resemble the Huffington Post and creating a home for Slate's "Trending News Channel" video project. In 2012, it was redesigned again, this time to focus more on the writing and editorial decisions of Josh Voorhees, who was then the blog's editor. This redesign also gave the blog a new slogan: "Your news companion." After this redesign was announced, Voorhees said, “The average Slate writer takes a little bit longer to craft a really definitive or provocative piece. The Slatest will always be that kind of ‘first responder’ for the site."
