= Klaus Mindrup =

German politician

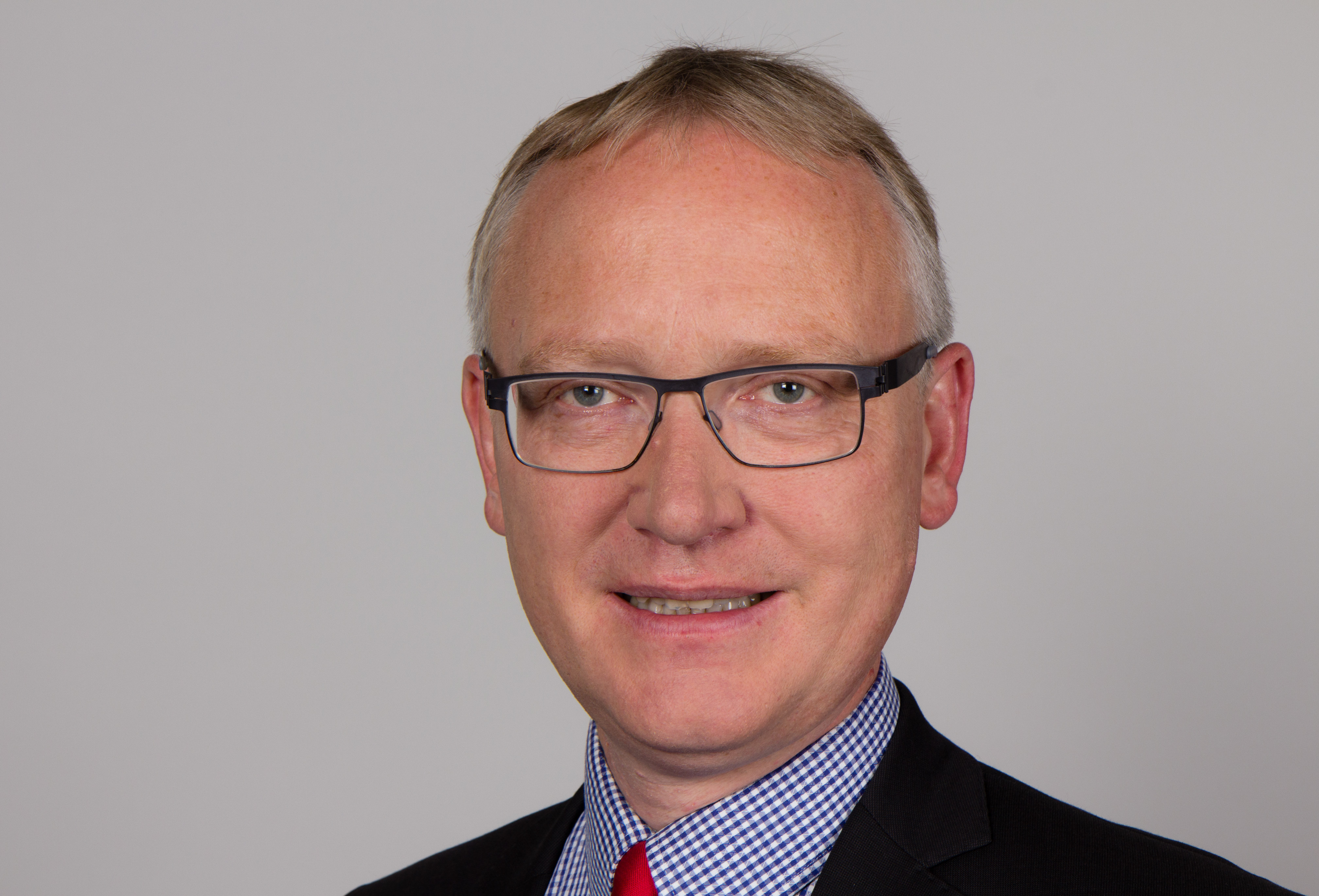
- Klaus Mindrup in 2014

Member of the Bundestag
- Incumbent
- Assumed office 2013

Personal details
- Born: 16 May 1964 (age 61) Lienen, West Germany (now Germany)
- Party: SPD

Klaus Mindrup (born 16 May 1964) is a German politician. Born in Lienen, North Rhine-Westphalia, he represents the SPD. Klaus Mindrup has served as a member of the Bundestag from the state of Berlin since 2013.

== Life ==
He became member of the bundestag after the 2013 German federal election. He is a member of the Committee on Construction, Housing, Urban Development and Communities and the Committee on Environment, Nature Conservation and Nuclear Safety.
