= Pankow 8 =

State electoral district of Germany

- Electoral district for the Berlin House of Representatives
- Pankow 8 in 2026
- District: Pankow
- Electorate: 30,301 (2026)

Current electoral district
- Party: Green
- Member: Daniela Billig

Pankow 8 is an electoral constituency (German: Wahlkreis) represented in the House of Representatives of Berlin. It elects one member via first-past-the-post voting.

== Geography ==
The constituency comprises the areas of Eberswalder Straße , Danziger Straße , Prenzlauer Allee , the S-Bahn line between Prenzlauer Allee and Greifswalder Straße , and Schwedter Straße up to the Mitte district boundary, within the borough of Pankow.

There were 30,301 eligible voters in 2026.

== Members ==
Election	Member	Party	%
2006	Volker Ratzmann	Green	34.6
2011	Volker Ratzmann	Green	32.1
2016	Stefan Gelbhaar	Green	29.4
2018	Nicole Ludwig	Green	
2021	Daniela Billig	Green	38.2
2023	Daniela Billig	Green	37.2
2026	Daniela Billig	Green	34.3

== Election results ==
=== 2026 election ===
State election (2026): Pankow 8
Notes:	Blue background denotes the winner of the electorate vote. Pink background denotes a candidate elected from their party list. Yellow background denotes an electorate win by a list member, or other incumbent. A ✓ or ✗ denotes status of any incumbent, win or lose respectively.						
Party	Candidate	Votes	%	±%	Party votes	%	±%
Greens	✓ Daniela Billig	8,502	34.3	▼2.9	6,375	25.6	▼8.7
Left	Gloria Viagra	6,626	26.7	▲8.6	7,897	31.7	▲13.1
CDU	Alexander Meyer	2,948	11.9	▼2.7	3,438	13.8	▼0.6
SPD	Heiko Kretschmer	2,524	10.2	▼4.6	2,493	10.0	▼3.6
AfD	Falk Rodig	1,482	6.0	▲2.1	1,511	6.1	▲2.2
Volt	Domenic Bay	1,188	4.8		1,159	6.1	▲2.2
BSW	Oliver Berger	892	3.6		840	3.4	
FDP	Maja Pfister	579	2.3	▼2.6	573	2.3	▼3.3
Tierschutzpartei					252	1.0	▼0.6
PARTEI					184	0.7	▼1.0
DL	Eckehart Ehrenberg	57	0.2				
PdF					48	0.2	
ÖDP					39	0.2	Steady
DKP					37	0.1	▼0.1
SGP					16	0.1	Steady
du.					14	0.1	▼0.2
Informal votes		190			112		
Total valid votes		24,798			24,876		
Turnout		24,988	82.5	▲11.6			
Greens hold	Majority	1,876	7.6				

=== 2023 repeat election ===
Changes denoted below for the 2023 election are compared to the 2016 election, as the 2021 election was declared invalid.

State election (2023): Pankow 8
Notes:	Blue background denotes the winner of the electorate vote. Pink background denotes a candidate elected from their party list. Yellow background denotes an electorate win by a list member, or other incumbent. A ✓ or ✗ denotes status of any incumbent, win or lose respectively.						
Party	Candidate	Votes	%	±%	Party votes	%	±%
Greens	Daniela Billig	7,533	37.2	▲7.5	6,958	34.3	▲4.9
Left	Janine Walter	3,676	18.2	▼1.8	3,784	18.7	▼2.1
SPD	Stephanie Wölk	2,993	14.8	▼10.8	2,761	13.6	▼4.9
CDU	Mario Röllig	2,957	14.6	▲3.2	2,917	14.4	▲4.2
FDP	Sandra Milkereit	991	4.9	▼1.2	1,131	5.6	▼1.3
AfD	Melanie König	790	3.9		782	3.9	▼2.5
Volt					442	2.2	
PARTEI	Jannis Kiesewalter	482	2.4	▼2.0	349	1.7	▼1.0
Tierschutzpartei	Marie Charlotte Motzkus	410	2.0		328	1.6	▲0.4
dieBasis	Wencke Loesener	242	1.2		200	1.0	
Klimaliste					96	0.5	
Pirates	Marianne Utz	106	0.5	▼2.2	76	0.4	▼1.9
Mieterpartei					68	0.3	
DKP					46	0.2	▼0.1
du.					44	0.2	
Humanists					40	0.2	
Team Todenhöfer					39	0.2	
Verjüngungsforschung					36	0.2	▼0.1
ÖDP					32	0.2	
The Grays					32	0.2	
Bergpartei, die ÜberPartei					31	0.2	
Gray Panthers					29	0.1	▼0.3
FW	Alexander Wilke	66	0.3		23	0.1	
Bildet Berlin!					10	0.0	
NPD					8	0.0	▼0.1
SGP					6	0.0	▼0.1
The Pinks/Alliance 21					6	0.0	
BüSo					2	0.0	▼0.1
LKR					1	0.0	▼0.3
Informal votes		99			65		
Total valid votes		20,246			20,277		
Turnout		20,352	70.8	▼3.2			
Greens hold	Majority	3,857	19.0				

=== 2021 election (annulled) ===
The election in 2021 was annulled and rerun in 2023.

State election (2021): Pankow 8
Notes:	Blue background denotes the winner of the electorate vote. Pink background denotes a candidate elected from their party list. Yellow background denotes an electorate win by a list member, or other incumbent. A ✓ or ✗ denotes status of any incumbent, win or lose respectively.						
Party	Candidate	Votes	%	±%	Party votes	%	±%
Alliance /The Greens	Daniela Billig	9,108	38.2	▲8.5	8,466	35.2	▲5.8
Left	Janine Walter	4,671	19.6	▼0.4	4,935	20.5	▼0.3
SPD	Stephanie Wölk	3,600	15.1	▼10.5	3,195	13.3	▼5.2
CDU	Mario Röllig	2,201	9.2	▼2.2	2,090	8.7	▼1.5
FDP	Sandra Milkereit	1,611	6.8	▲0.7	1,719	7.2	▲0.2
AfD	Melanie König	781	3.3		777	3.2	▼3.1
Volt					676	2.8	
PARTEI	Jannis Kiesewalter	631	2.6	▼1.8	507	2.1	▼0.6
dieBasis	Wencke Loesener	494	2.1		413	1.7	
Tierschutzpartei	Marie Charlotte Motzkus	404	1.7		260	1.1	▼0.1
Klimaliste					177	0.7	
FW	Alexander Wilke	165	0.7		104	0.4	
Pirates	Marianne Utz	156	0.7	▼2.1	100	0.4	▼1.8
The Grays					76	0.3	
Team Todenhöfer					66	0.3	
du.					65	0.3	
Verjüngungsforschung					55	0.2	▼0.1
Gray Panthers					46	0.2	▼0.2
APT					45	0.2	
Mieterpartei					45	0.2	
Bergpartei, die ÜberPartei					42	0.2	
Humanists					38	0.2	
ÖDP					31	0.1	
DKP					30	0.1	▼0.2
Bildet Berlin!					20	0.1	
The Pinks/Alliance 21					16	0.1	
NPD					10	0.0	▼0.1
LKR					8	0.0	▼0.2
SGP					8	0.0	▼0.1
BüSo					4	0.0	Steady
Informal votes		159			94		
Total valid votes		23,822			24,024		
Turnout		24,156	83.8	▲9.8			
Greens hold	Majority	4,437	18.6				

== See also ==
- Politics of Berlin
- House of Representatives of Berlin
