= Slate (magazine) =

American online politics and culture magazine

- Screenshot of the website in December 2024
- Website type: Online magazine
- Available in: 2 languages
- List of languages: English; French
- Owner: The Slate Group
- Founder: Michael Kinsley
- Editor: Hillary Frey
- Website: slate.com; slate.fr
- Commercial: Yes
- Registration: Optional for Slate Plus and commenting only (US readers); Metered paywall (non-US readers)
- Launched: June 24, 1996; 30 years ago
- Current status: Active
- ISSN: 1090-6584 (print); 1091-2339 (web)
- OCLC number: 728292344

Slate is an American online magazine that covers current affairs, politics, and culture in the United States. It was created in 1996 by Michael Kinsley with Microsoft's backing. In 2004, it was purchased by The Washington Post Company (later renamed the Graham Holdings Company), and since 2008 has been managed by The Slate Group, an online publishing entity created by Graham Holdings. Slate is based in New York City, with an additional office in Washington, D.C.

As of 2025, the magazine is both ad-supported and has a membership model with a metered paywall. It is known, and sometimes criticized, for adopting contrarian views, which gave rise to the term "Slate Pitches". It has a generally liberal editorial stance.

== History ==
=== Origin ===
Slate was founded on June 24, 1996 by Michael Kinsley under the ownership of Microsoft. Kinsley wrote that one of the site's goals was proving that "the economies of cyberspace make it easier for our kind of journalism to pay for itself". The outlet was considered an early pioneer of digital journalism and popularized features such as hyperlinks and communications between writers and readers. The website received much user traffic from the MSN network through its relationship with Microsoft. In 1998, Slate introduced a paywall-based business model that attracted up to 20,000 subscribers but was later abandoned. The outlet achieved a profitable quarter in 2003 and broke even in 2004 with $6 million in revenue from six million monthly readers.

=== Graham Holdings ownership ===
In 2004, the magazine was purchased by The Washington Post Company. An agreement in the purchase stipulated that the MSN website would continue to redirect to Slate. It introduced Slate V in 2007, an online video magazine website. Later, in 2008, The Washington Post Company launched The Slate Group, an online publishing entity, to manage Slate and other online magazines. The same year, Slate launched The Root, an African American news site, and "The Big Money", a business news website.

In 2011, Slate switched their content management system from Gutenberg to Adobe CQ5. In the same year, the magazine laid off several high-profile journalists, including co-founder Jack Shafer and Timothy Noah (author of the Chatterbox column). At the time, it had around 40 full-time editorial staff.

In 2012, then-editor David Plotz spoke at South by Southwest on Slate's efforts in running long-form journalism. Plotz discussed their commitment for all editors to spend four to six weeks each year to focus on a project, nicknamed "Fresca" projects, instead of working on news output. Slate also launched the "Slate Book Review", a monthly books section edited by Dan Kois, and a dedicated ad sales team.

In 2013, the magazine was redesigned under the guidance of design director Vivian Selbo. After The Washington Post Company sold The Washington Post to Jeff Bezos in 2013, Slate's parent company was renamed to Graham Holdings, which continued to own the magazine Slate.

In 2014, it was estimated that the website had 30 million visitors monthly. The same year, Slate introduced a paywall system called "Slate Plus", offering ad-free podcasts and bonus materials. A year later, it had attracted 9,000 subscribers, generating about $500,000 in annual revenue. By September 2014, Slate became profitable after preceding years had seen layoffs and falling ad revenue. Slate then moved all content behind a metered paywall for international readers in June 2015, attributing the change to advertisers targeting domestic readers.

In 2018, Slate staff members joined the Writers Guild of America, East. After union members authorized a strike, Slate agreed to a three-year collective bargaining agreement in January 2019.

In 2021, Mike Pesca, host of the podcast The Gist, was suspended from Slate after a Slack discussion on Donald G. McNeil Jr. and the usage of a racial slur, ultimately parting ways and taking his podcast independent.

On September 16, 2025, Slate filed a lawsuit against Google over alleged antitrust violations.

== slate.fr ==
In February 2009, slate.fr, a French-language offshoot of Slate, was launched. Its five founders were: Le Monde editors Jean-Marie Colombani and Éric Leser, Libération and 20 minutes editor Johan Hufnagel, Les Echos editor Éric Le Boucher, and political advisor Jacques Attali. The founders held fifty percent in the publishing company, while The Washington Post Company held 15 percent. In 2011, slate.fr started a separate site covering African news, Slate Afrique, with a Paris-based editorial staff.

== Content ==
=== Reputation for counterintuitive arguments ("Slate pitches") ===
Since 2006, Slate has been known for publishing contrarian pieces arguing against commonly held views about a subject, giving rise to the #slatepitches Twitter hashtag in 2009. The Columbia Journalism Review defined Slate pitches as "an idea that sounds wrong or counterintuitive proposed as though it were the tightest logic ever". In 2014, Slate's then editor-in-chief, Julia Turner, acknowledged that a reputation for counterintuitive arguments forms part of Slate's "distinctive" brand, but argued that the hashtag misrepresents the site's journalism.

In 2019, Slate editors such as David Plotz said that the Slate pitch had become difficult due to the polarizing politics of the Trump administration. In 2022, The New York Times reported that anonymous Slate staffers felt that the publication's reputation for contrarian views had diminished over the years. Former Slate writer Matthew Yglesias concurred with this reporting, stating that the journalism industry had become homogeneous in recent times.

=== Podcasts ===
According to the Nieman Foundation for Journalism, Slate has been involved in podcasts "almost from the very beginning" of the medium. Its first podcast, Political Gabfest, was released in 2005 and was inspired by Slate's editorial conference calls. Slate podcasts have gotten longer over the years. The original Gabfest ran 15 minutes; by 2012, most ran about 45 minutes. In 2012, it was reported that Slate's podcasts had the highest advertisement and sell-through rates of their content on account of high user engagement.

By June 2012, Slate had expanded their lineup to 19 podcasts, with Political Gabfest and Culture Gabfest being the most popular. This count had shrunk to 14 by February 2015, with all receiving six million downloads per month. In 2018, it offered a slate of 25 podcasts.

- Amicus
- Audio Book Club
- Culture Gabfest
- Decoder Ring – with Willa Paskin
- Hang Up and Listen – sports
- Hit Parade – pop music and the Billboard charts
- Lexicon Valley – language issues
- Manners for the Digital Age
- Money
- Negotiation Academy
- One Year – discussion of affairs from a given year
- Political Gabfest
- Spoiler Specials – film discussion
- Studio 360 – pop culture and the arts, in partnership with Public Radio International
- The Gist
- Thirst Aid Kit
- Trumpcast
- Slow Burn
- What's next

=== Recurring features ===
- Assessment
- Books
- Dear Prudence (advice column)
- Dispatches
- Drink
- Food
- Foreigners
- Gaming
- Science Denial
- Shopping
- The Good Word (language)
- The Movie Club
- The TV Club
- Slatest (news aggregator)

== Reception ==
The Nieman Foundation for Journalism regarded the outlet as the "web's oldest living magazine". In 2004, The New York Times opined that the publication produced "well-regarded journalism". In 2010, the Columbia Journalism Review commended Slate's high-quality editorial standards and praised its usage of interactive and multimedia content, calling them "consistently innovative, and often a big hit with readers". In 2019, The New York Times wrote that Slate was known for "counterintuitive analysis and its many podcasts". In 2022, Katie Robertson of the New York Times noted Slate was known for its "smart analysis, interesting debate and top-tier journalistic talent".

=== Accolades ===
In 2003, Slate won the National Magazine Award (NMA) for General Excellence. Slate was also nominated for four digital National Magazine Awards in 2011 and won the NMA for General Excellence. Between 2009 and 2014, Slate was nominated for an NMA 14 times, winning the award twice. Slate received an NMA for general excellence in 2016. Slate's investment in podcasts has led to receiving some awards, including Slow Burn and Political Gabfest.

==== National Magazine Awards ====
Year	Category	Article(s)	Author(s)	Ref.
2003	General Excellence, Digital Media	N/A	N/A	
2011	General Excellence, Digital Media	N/A	N/A	
2013	Columns and Commentary	It’s Not About the Law, Stupid", "The Supreme Court’s Dark Vision of Freedom", "Where Is The Liberal Outrage?"	Dahlia Lithwick	
2016	Podcasting	Slow Burn: "Deal or No Deal", "Tell-All", "Move On"	N/A	

=== Controversies ===
==== "Monkeyfishing" ====
On June 7, 2001, Slate published an article by Jay Forman of a practice of fisherman from an island in the Florida Keys of fishing for rhesus monkeys. The Wall Street Journal and The New York Times found the claim to be a hoax after investigation. Later, Forman admitted to his editor, Jack Shafer, that his claim had been fabricated.

== Staff ==
Michael Kinsley was Slate's founder and served as its first editor-in-chief from 1996 to 2002. He was followed by Jacob Weisberg, who held the position from 2002 to 2008. Afterward, David Plotz became editor until July 2014, when he was replaced by Julia Turner. After Turner resigned in 2019 to join the Los Angeles Times, Jared Hohlt became editor on April 1, 2019.

Former HuffPost editor Hillary Frey was named as the magazine's new editor-in-chief in May 2022.

=== Key executives ===
- Hillary Frey (editor in chief)
- Dan Check (chief executive officer)

=== Notable contributors and departments ===
- Anne Applebaum (Foreigners)
- John Dickerson (Politics)
- Simon Doonan (Fashion)
- Stefan Fatsis (Hang Up and Listen)
- Ashley Feinberg (Politics)
- Daniel Gross (The Juice)
- David Greenberg (History Lesson)
- Margo Howard (Dear Prudence 1998–2006)
- Fred Kaplan (War Stories)
- Juliet Lapidos (Books / Explainer / Brow Beat)
- Dahlia Lithwick (Jurisprudence)
- Michael Moran (Reckoning / Foreign Policy)
- Timothy Noah (The Customer)
- Meghan O'Rourke (The Highbrow/Grieving)
- Daniel M. Lavery (Dear Prudence 2015–2021)
- Robert Pinsky (poetry editor)
- Phil Plait (Bad Astronomy / Science)
- Ron Rosenbaum (Spectator)
- William Saletan (Human Nature)
- Jack Shafer (Press Box)
- Eliot Spitzer (The Best Policy)
- Herbert Stein (Dear Prudence 1997–1998)
- Mike Steinberger (Drink)
- Dana Stevens (Surfergirl through 2005/Movies)
- James Surowiecki (The Book Club)
- Leon Neyfakh (Podcast)
- Tom Vanderbilt (Transport)
- Jacob Weisberg (The Big Idea)
- Tim Wu (Technology/Jurisprudence)
- Emily Yoffe (Dear Prudence 2006–2015, Human Guinea Pig)
- Reihan Salam (Politics)
- Laura Miller (Books and Culture)
- Carl Wilson (Music)

=== Past contributors ===
- Emily Bazelon
- Jamelle Bouie
- Pete Buttigieg
- Paul Boutin
- Ian Bremmer
- Phil Carter
- David Edelstein
- Franklin Foer
- Sasha Frere-Jones
- Atul Gawande
- Austan Goolsbee
- David Greenberg
- Robert Lane Greene
- Virginia Heffernan
- David Helvarg
- Christopher Hitchens
- Ken Jennings
- Jodi Kantor
- Mickey Kaus
- Patrick Radden Keefe
- Paul Krugman
- Steven Landsburg
- Will Leitch
- Farhad Manjoo
- Louis Menand
- Helaine Olen
- Mike Pesca
- David Plotz
- Daniel Radosh
- Bruce Reed
- Jody Rosen
- James Surowiecki
- Julia Turner
- Josh Voorhees
- Rob Walker
- David Weigel
- Robert Wright
- Matthew Yglesias
- Fareed Zakaria
