= Scientific plagiarism in Germany =

Form of misconduct

Scientific plagiarism in Germany became widely discussed during the Guttenberg plagiarism scandal, which has led to other, mostly doctoral, dissertations being scrutinised. Initially focused on the dissertations of notable persons submitted at German institutions, non-doctoral works in languages other than German submitted at institutions outside Germany have since also been scrutinised.

This scrutiny has found extensive plagiarism in the work of several notable persons, including cabinet members, and in a significant number of cases – but not all – their academic degree has been rescinded. As of 2024, the German VroniPlag Wiki has, since it started in 2011, published the plagiarism found in over 200 works; in at least 90 of these cases the academic degree was rescinded. Each year, about 30,000 doctorates are completed in Germany.

However, academic misconduct has been a topic in Germany for centuries, especially at the doctoral level since one of the rights and privileges that come with an academic degree at this level is the title of doctor. In Germany, this title has been regarded since the 16th century "almost equal to a noble title." While the legal privileges of royalty and nobility were abolished in Germany in 1919 following the German revolution and proclamation of the republic at the end of World War I, hereditary titles continue to form part of surnames that continue to be protected by law, the wealth and power of formerly royal and noble families has remained, and German media continues to treat royal and noble persons is if it had never been abolished. Therefore obtaining the title of doctor equates to a significant rise in social status in Germany and thus motivation for doing so, with the achievement itself seemingly less important than the title. When accusations of plagiarism first emerged, Guttenberg volunteered to stop using the title, and when the doctorate was rescinded leading to loss of privilege to use the title, German media focused on the loss of title rather than the academic degree as a recognition of effort and achievement.

== Notable cases ==
Author	Profession	Dissertation	Year of work	University	Sanction	Year of sanction
Jorgo Chatzimarkakis	Politician	Informationeller Globalismus: Kooperationsmodell globaler Ordnungspolitik am Beispiel des Elektronischen Geschäftsverkehrs	2000	University of Bonn	Degree rescinded	2011
Bijan Djir-Sarai	Politician	Ökologische Modernisierung der PVC-Branche in Deutschland	2008	University of Cologne	Degree rescinded	2012
Klaus Goehrmann	Manager	Beitrag zum technologisch-wirtschaftlichen Vergleich des gepulsten zum kontinuierlichen Laserstrahlschweißen	2010	Clausthal University of Technology	Degree rescinded	2014
Jürgen Goldschmidt	Politician	Management des Stadtumbaus unter Berücksichtigung der städtebaurechtlichen Rahmenbedingungen	2009	Technische Universität Berlin	Degree surrendered	2013
Florian Graf	Politician	Der Entwicklungsprozess einer Oppositionspartei nach dem abrupten Ende langjähriger Regierungsverantwortung am Beispiel der Christlich Demokratischen Union (CDU) in der Hauptstadt Berlin während der 15. Wahlperiode (2001–2006)	2010	University of Potsdam	Degree rescinded	2012
Karl-Theodor zu Guttenberg	Politician	Verfassung und Verfassungsvertrag: Konstitutionelle Entwicklungsstufen in den USA und der EU	2006	University of Bayreuth	Degree rescinded	2011
Andreas Kasper	Lawyer and politician	Sozialsponsoring: Eine rechtliche Bewertung unter besonderer Berücksichtigung des Sponsorings kirchlicher Werke und Einrichtungen	2004	University of Göttingen	Degree rescinded	2010
Sarah Sophie Koch	TV actor	Mentalisierungsfähigkeit der Mutter und kindliche Bindung	2011	University of Düsseldorf	Degree rescinded	2015
Silvana Koch-Mehrin	Politician	Historische Währungsunion zwischen Wirtschaft und Politik: Die Lateinische Münzunion 1865–1927	2000	Heidelberg University	Degree rescinded	2011
Jakob Kreidl	Politician	Der Kosovo-Konflikt: Vorgeschichte, Verlauf und Perspektiven. Zur Stabilisierung einer Krisenregion	2005	University of the Bundeswehr Munich	Degree rescinded	2013
Ursula von der Leyen	Politician	C-reaktives Protein als diagnostischer Parameter zur Erfassung eines Amnioninfektionssyndroms bei vorzeitigem Blasensprung und therapeutischem Entspannungsbad in der Geburtsvorbereitung	1991	Hannover Medical School	University found plagiarism, but also found it acceptable at that university	2015
Margarita Mathiopoulos	Entrepreneur and publisher	Geschichte und Fortschritt im Denken Amerikas: Ein europäisch-amerikanischer Vergleich	1986	University of Bonn	Degree rescinded	2012
Friedrich Wilhelm von Preußen	Historian	Die Reichsgründung 1870/71 im Spiegel neutraler Pressestimmen	1971	University of Erlangen–Nuremberg	Degree rescinded	1973
Matthias Pröfrock	Lawyer and politician	Energieversorgungssicherheit im Recht der Europäischen Union/ Europäischen Gemeinschaften	2007	University of Tübingen	Degree rescinded	2011
Annette Schavan	Politician	Person und Gewissen: Studien zu Voraussetzungen, Notwendigkeit und Erfordernissen heutiger Gewissensbildung.	1980	University of Düsseldorf	Degree rescinded	2013
Anette Seelinger	Artist and teacher	Ästhetische Konstellationen: Zur Konzeption kritisch-ästhetischer Bildung in der medien-technologischen Gesellschaft	2000	Technische Universität Darmstadt	Degree rescinded	2011
Daniel Volk	Politician	Die Begrenzung kriegerischer Konflikte durch das moderne Völkerrecht	2004	University of Würzburg	University found plagiarism but also found it acceptable at that university	2013

== See also ==
- Scientific misconduct
