= Ioanna-Maria Gertsou =

Ioanna-Maria Gertsou (born January 20, 1979, in Athens Greece) is a representative of the Greek guide dog movement, through "Lara Guide-Dog School" a non - profit organisation that she co-founded in 2008. She is visually impaired due to retinopathy of prematurity. She is mostly known as "Lara" is the first guide dog related organisation of Greece. She is an activist, promoting human diversity, guide dog access, physical and electronic accessibility and animal rights.

She is also a psychologist with superior studies in psychology, experimental psychology and cognitive science. From 2006 to 2012, she worked as a researcher in the Human/computer Interaction Laboratory, located at the Foundation for Research and Technology – Hellas (FORTH) which is considered to be a major scientific center worldwide. In 2008, during a visit at FORTH the President of the Hellenic Republic, Karolos Papoulias was moved by her presentation and did something extraordinary: he bowed and kissed her hand to show his respect. Ioanna-Maria is one among the few visually impaired or disabled scientists around the world and the only one, currently employed in the Greek National Health Care System. Additionally, she is considered to be a rare case of a person who is blind since birth to exhibit visual (graphic) synesthesia. That is why, she is being asked to contribute to studies and projects regarding perception and the crossing of the senses. Synesthesia also contributed to her ability to take photos, with her guide-dogs being her main models. Up to today (2021) she participated in four photography exhibitions and one photo album. Every year, she is invited and participates in numerous conferences, arising matters varying from psychological research to guide dogs and contemporary issues as youth unemployment., Her knowledge in psychology is often shared on newspapers and blogs. She was the first person to enter with her guide dog (and a dog in general), into the Hellenic Parliament and the European Parliament. In 2009, she protested through the web because her guide dog was denied in two restaurants. She wrote a letter which went viral and caused great awareness. Following this incident, one year later a Spanish tourist named Antonia Pons Losada was not permitted into the new Acropolis Museum with her guide dog. As a result of local and international outcry regarding issues of guide dog access in Greece in August 2010, Ioanna contributed to the voting of the first national law, regarding guide dog access and since then, guide dogs and assistance dogs are allowed to practically everywhere in Greece (public places, transportation means, reustaurants, supermarkets, hospitals... etc.). As soon as the law was approved by the Greek Parliament, she took her guide dog "May" and a Television crew for a visit to the Acropolis Museum. Today on the museum's website we are informed that "guide and assistance dogs, are welcome". The law was recently reviewed, including guide dogs and assistance dogs that are still in training and clarifying that they can enter into transportation means, without wearing a muzzle and without being in carrying box. While transforming Greece into a role model for guide dog access, she joined the board of directors of the European Guide Dog Federation to defend the rights and access of guide dog teams, throughout the European Union. In 2013 at the European Parliament, she and former MEP Jorgo Chatzimarkakis were the main rapporteurs for the voting of an E.U. direction, aiming to promote e-accessibility on governmental websites. The direction was approved in 2014. Ioanna-Maria, was two times a political candidate. One in the 2009 Hellenic National Elections with the Ecogreens Party and one in the 2014 European Elections with the "Greek European Citizens Party". She was a paracycling athlete. In 2016, she became victim of a racist attack from a bus driver who called the police in order to take her out of the vehicle because of her guide dog "May". The incident became viral and caused a general outbreak within the Greek society and media, resulting to the public apology of the National Organisation of Public transports. Her first guide dog "Lara" and first guide dog in Greece, from which the NGO took its name, died on March 26, 2016. Always accompanied by her three guide dogs "Lara", "May" and "Babbu" she appears on several documentaries, TV shows, movies and public events. She is a member of New Democraty Political Party and from 2019 to 2020 she was Vice Secretary for Human Rights & Social Solidarity. She currently works as a psychologist in the Athens Children's Hospital "Aghia Sophia".
