= Hoth (disambiguation) =

Hoth is a fictional planet in the Star Wars universe.

Hoth may also refer to:

- Höðr or Hoth, a god in Norse mythology
- Hoth, a fictional planet in the novel Space Viking by H. Beam Piper

== Places ==
- Harrow-on-the-Hill station on London's Metropolitan line
- OGLE-2005-BLG-390Lb, an icy super-Earth exoplanet

== People with the surname ==
- Hermann Hoth (1885–1971), German panzer commander in World War II
- Frank Schwalba-Hoth (born 1952), German former politician

== Other uses ==
- Hoth Inc., a North American airline holding company
- Houses of the Holy, the 1973 album by Led Zeppelin

== See also ==
- The dictionary definition of Höðr at Wiktionary
