= Tempelhof-Schöneberg 7 =

State electoral district of Germany

- Electoral district for the Berlin House of Representatives
- Tempelhof-Schöneberg 7 in 2026
- District: Tempelhof-Schöneberg
- Electorate: 32,586 (2026)

Current electoral district
- Party: CDU
- Member: Christian Zander

Tempelhof-Schöneberg 7 is an electoral constituency (German: Wahlkreis) represented in the House of Representatives of Berlin. It elects one member via first-past-the-post voting.

== Geography ==
The constituency comprises the southern part of the Marienfelde district, and the northern part of the Lichtenrade district, and is entirely within the borough of Tempelhof-Schöneberg.

There were 32,586 eligible voters in 2026.

== Members ==
Election	Member	Party	%
1990	Joachim Palm	CDU	60.9
1995	Hubert Rösler	CDU	54.8
1999	Norbert Atzler	CDU	62.8
2001	Norbert Atzler	CDU	44.7
2006	Scott Korber	CDU	44.0
2011	Roman Simon	CDU	46.6
2016	Hildegard Bentele	CDU	33.8
2021	Christian Zander	CDU	35.6
2023	Christian Zander	CDU	49.6
2026	Christian Zander	CDU	35.0

== Election results ==
=== 2026 election ===
State election (2026): Tempelhof-Schöneberg 7
Notes:	Blue background denotes the winner of the electorate vote. Pink background denotes a candidate elected from their party list. Yellow background denotes an electorate win by a list member, or other incumbent. A ✓ or ✗ denotes status of any incumbent, win or lose respectively.						
Party	Candidate	Votes	%	±%	Party votes	%	±%
CDU	✓ Christian Zander	8,291	35.0	▼14.7	7,590	31.7	▼15.6
AfD	Karl-Heinz Turban	4,620	19.5	▲10.6	4,765	19.9	▲11.0
SPD	Annette Hertlein	3,238	13.7	▼5.9	3,253	13.6	▼5.6
Left	Katharina Marg	2,799	11.8	▲8.6	2,891	12.1	▲8.5
Greens	Katharina Hild	2,650	11.2	▲1.5	2,411	10.1	▲1.0
BSW	Christina Brandt	867	3.7		828	3.5	
FDP	Axel Bering	833	3.5	▼0.8	896	3.7	▼1.6
Tierschutzpartei					651	2.7	▲0.5
Volt	Sebastian von Haldenwang	409	1.7		349	1.5	▲1.0
PARTEI					110	0.5	▼0.3
PdF					79	0.3	
ÖDP					34	0.1	▲1.0
SGP					30	0.1	▲0.1
du.					19	0.1	Steady
DKP					10	0.0	Steady
Informal votes		519			310		
Total valid votes		23,707			23,916		
Turnout		24,226	74.3	▲7.6			
CDU hold	Majority	3,671	15.5	▼14.5			

=== 2023 repeat election ===
Changes denoted below for the 2023 election are compared to the 2016 election, as the 2021 election was declared invalid.

State election (2023): Tempelhof-Schöneberg 7
Notes:	Blue background denotes the winner of the electorate vote. Pink background denotes a candidate elected from their party list. Yellow background denotes an electorate win by a list member, or other incumbent. A ✓ or ✗ denotes status of any incumbent, win or lose respectively.						
Party	Candidate	Votes	%	±%	Party votes	%	±%
CDU	Christian Zander	10,546	49.6	▲15.8	10,071	47.3	▲17.6
SPD	Melanie Kühnemann-Grunow	4,154	19.6	▼4.0	4,081	19.2	▼3.1
Greens	Tanja Prinz	2,050	9.6	▼0.9	1,925	9.0	▼1.1
AfD	Karl-Heinz Turban	1,890	8.9	▼6.6	1,895	8.9	▼6.6
FDP	Marcus Strempel	926	4.4	▼4.5	1,147	5.4	▼4.7
Left	Alexander King	684	3.2	▼1.5	762	3.6	▼1.5
Tierschutzpartei	Lisa Döring	661	3.1		469	2.2	▲0.4
PARTEI	Sebastian Richter	226	1.1		161	0.8	Steady
Volt					102	0.5	
Gray Panthers					99	0.5	▼0.8
Pirates					80	0.4	▼0.6
Team Todenhöfer					73	0.3	
The Grays					73	0.3	
dieBasis	Elena Ihm	110	0.5		66	0.3	
Verjüngungsforschung					42	0.2	▼0.2
FW					39	0.2	
Mieterpartei					34	0.2	
Bildet Berlin!					31	0.1	
MW					24	0.1	▼0.2
Humanists					19	0.1	
DKP					15	0.1	Steady
du.					14	0.1	
ÖDP					14	0.1	
Klimaliste					12	0.1	
NPD					12	0.1	▼0.5
The Pinks/Alliance 21					11	0.1	
LKR					4	0.0	▼0.4
Bergpartei, die ÜberPartei					2	0.0	
SGP					2	0.0	▼0.1
BüSo					1	0.0	▼0.1
Informal votes		21,247			21,280		
Total valid votes		200			172		
Turnout		21,470	66.7	▼3.7			
CDU hold	Majority	6,392	30.0				

=== 2021 election (annulled) ===
The election in 2021 was annulled and rerun in 2023.

State election (2021): Tempelhof-Schöneberg 7
Notes:	Blue background denotes the winner of the electorate vote. Pink background denotes a candidate elected from their party list. Yellow background denotes an electorate win by a list member, or other incumbent. A ✓ or ✗ denotes status of any incumbent, win or lose respectively.						
Party	Candidate	Votes	%	±%	Party votes	%	±%
CDU	Christian Zander	8,727	35.6	▲1.8	8,367	33.9	▲4.2
SPD	Melanie Kühnemann-Grunow	6,005	24.5	▲1.0	5,811	23.6	▲1.3
Greens	Tanja Prinz	2,798	11.4	▲0.9	2,609	10.6	▲0.4
AfD	Karl-Heinz Turban	2,168	8.8	▼6.7	2,156	8.7	▼6.8
FDP	Marcus Strempel	2,132	8.7	▼0.2	2,117	8.6	▼1.5
Tierschutzpartei	Lisa Döring	1,012	4.1		581	2.4	▲0.5
Left	Alexander King	978	4.0	▼0.8	1,034	4.2	▼0.9
PARTEI	Sebastian Richter	371	1.5		261	1.1	▲0.3
FW					241	1.0	
Team Todenhöfer					229	0.9	
dieBasis	Elena Ihm	334	1.4		209	0.8	
The Grays					175	0.7	
Volt					137	0.6	
APT					127	0.5	
Gray Panthers					127	0.5	▼0.8
Pirates					83	0.3	▼0.6
Verjüngungsforschung					61	0.2	▼0.1
Bildet Berlin!					47	0.2	
MW					36	0.1	▼0.2
Klimaliste					33	0.1	
Mieterpartei					33	0.1	
Humanists					29	0.1	
NPD					28	0.1	▼0.4
du.					27	0.1	
ÖDP					27	0.1	
The Pinks/Alliance 21					20	0.1	
LKR					14	0.1	▼0.3
BüSo					10	0.0	▼0.1
DKP					10	0.0	Steady
Bergpartei, die ÜberPartei					7	0.0	
SGP					2	0.0	▼0.1
Informal votes		399			314		
Total valid votes		24,525			24,648		
Turnout		24,985	76.8	▲6.4			
CDU hold	Majority	2,722	11.1				

== See also ==
- Politics of Berlin
- House of Representatives of Berlin
