= Jörg Baberowski =

German historian (born 1961)

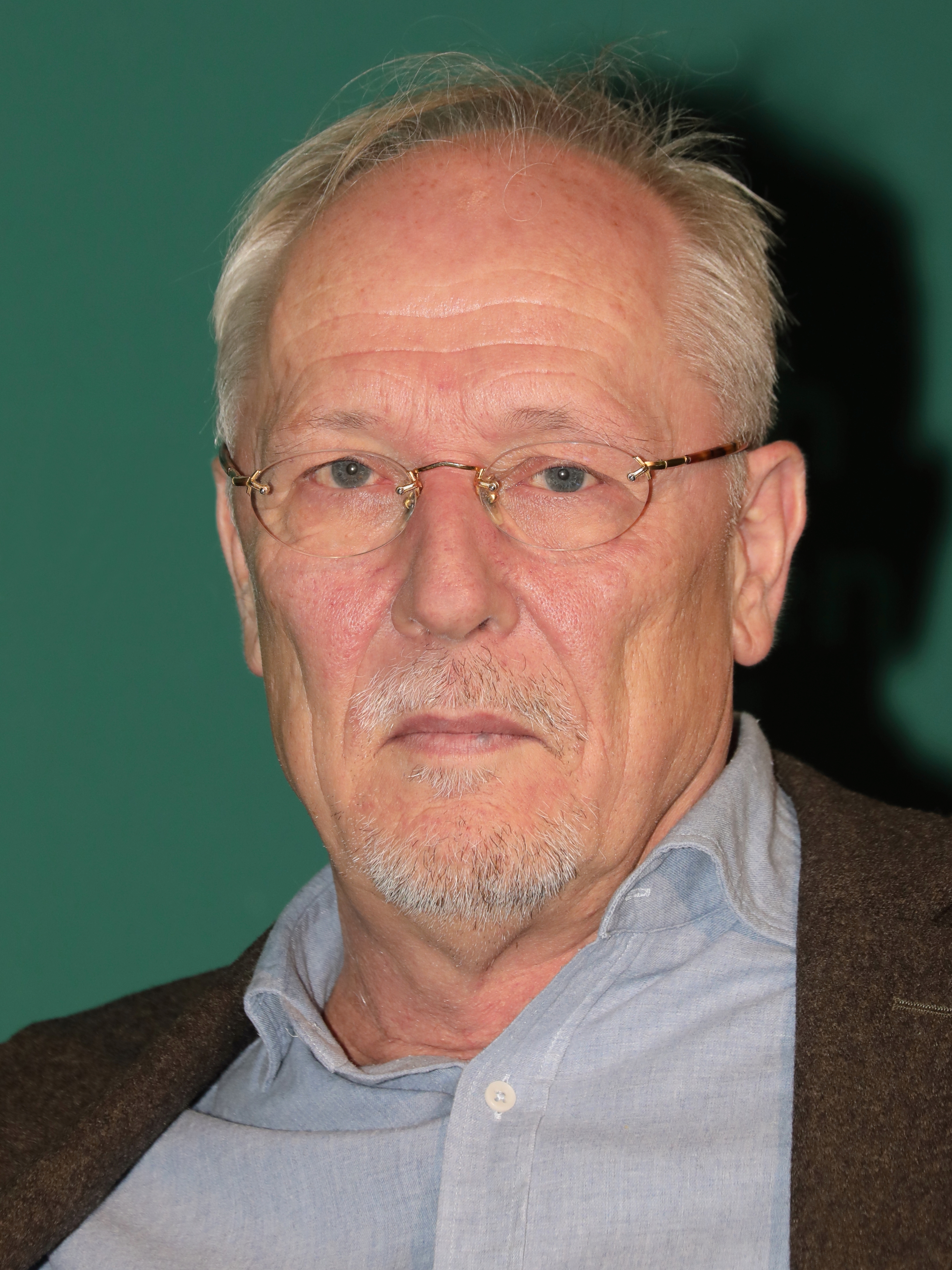
- Baberowski in 2024
- Born: 24 March 1961 (age 65); Radolfzell am Bodensee, West Germany

Academic work
- Discipline: Historian
- Sub-discipline: History of Eastern Europe; violence studies
- Institutions: Humboldt University of Berlin

Jörg Baberowski (born 24 March 1961) is a German historian and Professor of Eastern European History at the Humboldt University of Berlin. He studies the history of the Soviet Union and Stalinist violence. Baberowski earlier served as Director of the Historical Institute and Dean of the Faculty of Philosophy I at Humboldt University.

== Background ==
Baberowski was born in Radolfzell am Bodensee, West Germany. He grew up in a Catholic working class and social democratic family. His grandfather was Polish; the Baberowski family thus belonged to the Ruhr Polish minority, Polish immigrants to the rapidly industrializing areas of the Ruhr Valley. Baberowski's wife is Iranian-born and fled to Germany following the Iranian Revolution.

== Academic career ==
He studied history and philosophy at the University of Göttingen between 1982 and 1988 As a student Baberowski learned Russian, and he wrote his master's thesis on "political justice" in the last years of the Russian Empire. While working as a student Baberowski advocated for the views of historian Ernst Nolte, who had launched the Historikerstreit controversy by arguing that the Germans did not deserve special culpability for The Holocaust.

Beginning in 1989, Baberowski worked as a researcher in eastern European history at the Goethe University Frankfurt and earned his doctorate there in 1993 with a dissertation titled Autokratie und Justiz im Zarenreich ("Autocracy and Justice in Czarist Russia"). He joined the Institute of Eastern European History at Tübingen in 1993, and earned his Habilitation in 2000 with the dissertation Auf der Suche nach Eindeutigkeit, which was published as a book titled Der Feind ist überall. Stalinismus im Kaukasus. Baberowski went on to conduct archival studies in Azerbaijan, Finland, Russia and other countries.

Baberowski was appointed to a chair in Eastern European history at the University of Leipzig in 2001, before joining the Humboldt University as a professor of Eastern European History in 2002. He was also the director of its Institute of History.

== Distinction ==
At the Leipzig Book Fair in 2012, he won the Leipzig Book Prize in the category of nonfiction/essay writing for his book Verbrannte Erde. Stalins Herrschaft der Gewalt (transl. Scorched earth: Stalin's rule of violence).

== Academic criticism ==
Benno Ennker, who teaches Eastern European history in Tübingen and St. Gallen, criticized Baberowski's book Verbrannte Erde for its "implicit exoneration of the Wehrmacht" in World War II during the war against the Soviet Union. Historian Christoph Dieckmann of the Fritz Bauer Institute, a center on the history and impact of the Holocaust, accused Baberowski of failing to recognize the "general state of research, which proves a far-reaching consensus of the German leadership and the upper echelons of the Wehrmacht, prior to the assault on the Soviet Union, to subject many millions of Soviet citizens to death by starvation within a few months". Martin Wagner, a research fellow at Humboldt, noted that Baberowski's critics accuse him of falling behind modern historical research on totalitarianism.

== Political views and disputes ==
As a student Baberowski joined the Communist League of West Germany, which was aligned with Maoism, even raising money for Pol Pot, though he later distanced himself from these views.

In a 2014 interview with Der Spiegel, Baberowski reiterated his support for Ernst Nolte, saying,

Hitler was no psychopath, and he wasn't vicious. He didn't want people to talk about the extermination of the Jews at his table. Stalin, on the other hand, delighted in adding to and signing off on the death lists. He was vicious. He was a psychopath.

Baberowski clarified his remarks by noting that while "Stalin enjoyed violence, Hitler did not." Baberowski added that this did not make Hitler's actions morally better, but worse.

In response to the refugee crisis in Europe in 2015, Baberowski called for a more restrictive policy toward immigrants in Germany and criticized German Chancellor Angela Merkel's approach in a number of articles and interviews.

In 2016, Baberowski sued the General Students' Committee (AStA) of the University of Bremen for distributing a leaflet that called him "radical right-wing" and "racist" and accused him of theses that were "glorifying violence" and "frighteningly brutal". The Cologne district court ruled it illegal to label him as "racist", but permissible, under the freedom of speech, to claim that Baberowski advocated "radical right-wing positions". According to the court it does not matter, whether this rating is correct or wrong. When the AStA appealed against this decision, Baberowski withdrew his complaint, after the Cologne court of appeal hinted that it would reject it.

In June 2017, law professor Andreas Fischer-Lescano, head of the Center for European Law and Politics at Bremen University, wrote in the Frankfurter Rundschau supporting the students. He stated that Baberowski's "academic oeuvre and short-term political remarks" blended into "an amalgam of radical right-wing criticism that is interspersed with historical revisionist and nationalist motifs". The Neue Zürcher Zeitung described Lescano's article as an attempt to establish an opinion police force (″Meinungspolizei″).

== Conflict with Trotskyists ==
Baberowski has been in a conflict with the Trotskyist Socialist Equality Party (SGP) and its student wing since 2014. The Frankfurter Allgemeine Zeitung wrote that the conflict may have begun after he invited British historian Robert Service, who has written critically about Trotsky, as a guest lecturer at his institute.

The Times Higher Education reported in 2015 that according to Baberowski, he has been harassed by left-wing students. The conservative newspaper Die Welt wrote in 2017 that "Baberowski is regarded as Germany's leading expert on Stalinism. This makes him a hate figure of leftist groups." Karl Schlögel, Professor of Eastern European History, called the campaign of the Trotskyists a targeted calumny.

In November 2017, Baberowski lost a defamation lawsuit against the SGP: the Hamburg district court ruled that the party could accuse Baberowski of a "falsification of history", referencing Baberowski's statements about Adolf Hitler.

The Presidium and Dean's Office of the Faculty of Philosophy I at the Humboldt University stood behind Baberowski after the judgment in the first instance and again after the hearing at the Higher Regional Court (Oberlandesgericht). They published a statement saying that Baberowski's integrity is beyond doubt; his scientific statements are controversial, but not radical right wing. A number of professors from the Humboldt University of Berlin and one professor from LMU Munich agreed with this statement.

== Selected works ==
- Autokratie und Justiz. Zum Verhältnis von Rechtsstaatlichkeit und Rückständigkeit im ausgehenden Zarenreich 1864–1914, Frankfurt am Main (Klostermann) 1996, ISBN 3-465-02832-5.
- Zivilisation der Gewalt. Die kulturellen Ursprünge des Stalinismus, Berlin 2003, ISBN 3-860-04184-3.
- Der Feind ist überall. Stalinismus im Kaukasus, Munich (DVA) 2003, ISBN 3-421-05622-6.
- Der rote Terror. Die Geschichte des Stalinismus, Munich (DVA) 2003, ISBN 3-421-05486-X.
- Der Sinn der Geschichte. Geschichtstheorien von Hegel bis Foucault, Munich (C.H. Beck) 2005, ISBN 3-406-52793-0.
- Jörg Baberowski und Anselm Doering-Manteuffel: Ordnung durch Terror. Bonn (Dietz) 2006, ISBN 3-8012-0368-9.
- Moderne Zeiten? Krieg, Revolution und Gewalt im 20. Jahrhundert, Göttingen 2006, ISBN 3-525-36735-X.
- Verbrannte Erde. Stalins Herrschaft der Gewalt, Munich (C.H. Beck) 2012, ISBN 978-3-406-63254-9.
- Räume der Gewalt. Frankfurt am Main (S. Fischer) 2015, ISBN 978-3-10-004818-9.

Edited volumes

- Moderne Zeiten?. Krieg, Revolution und Gewalt im 20. Jahrhundert. Mit 5 Tabellen. Vandenhoeck und Ruprecht, Göttingen 2006, ISBN 3-525-36735-X (Bundeszentrale für politische Bildung 2006).
- with Hartmut Kaelble, Jürgen Schriewer: Selbstbilder und Fremdbilder. Repräsentation sozialer Ordnungen im Wandel. Campus, Frankfurt 2008, ISBN 978-3-593-38016-2.
- with David Feest, Maike Lehmann: Dem Anderen begegnen. Eigene und fremde Repräsentationen in sozialen Gemeinschaften. Campus, Frankfurt 2008, ISBN 978-3-593-38722-2.
- with David Feest, Christoph Gumb: Imperiale Herrschaft in der Provinz. Repräsentationen politischer Macht im späten Zarenreich. Campus, Frankfurt 2008, ISBN 978-3-593-38721-5.
- Arbeit an der Geschichte. Wie viel Theorie braucht die Geschichtswissenschaft? Campus, Frankfurt 2010, ISBN 978-3-593-39149-6.
- with Gabriele Metzler: Gewalträume. soziale Ordnungen im Ausnahmezustand. Campus, Frankfurt 2012, ISBN 978-3-593-39231-8.
- Was ist Vertrauen?. Ein interdisziplinäres Gespräch. Campus, Frankfurt 2014, ISBN 978-3-593-50062-1.
- with Robert Kindler: Macht ohne Grenzen. Herrschaft und Terror im Stalinismus. Campus, Frankfurt 2014, ISBN 978-3-593-50164-2.
