= Konrad Hesse =

German jurisprudence scientist

Justice of the Federal Constitutional Court of Germany
- In office 7 November 1975 – 16 July 1987

Konrad Hesse (January 29, 1919 – March 15, 2005) was a German jurist and, from 1975 to 1987, a justice of the Federal Constitutional Court.

Hesse was born in Königsberg, East Prussia. He entered the scientific field after his education in law. He obtained his doctorate degree in 1950, and was habilited in 1955 at the University of Göttingen. His habilitation covered state, administration and canon laws. He received his first ordinary professorship in 1965 at the University of Freiburg. Additionally, he worked from 1961 to 1975 as a judge at the Supreme Administrative Court in Baden-Württemberg.

As a judge at the Federal Constitutional Court of Germany, Hesse was a member of the first senate and coined, in connection with the census judgement in 1983, the term of the right to informational self-determination. To solve the clash of civil rights, he produced the so-called term of practical concordance.

Since 2003 Hesse was a member of the Bavarian Academy of Sciences and Humanities. He died in Merzhausen.

== Works and writings ==
- Grundzüge des Verfassungsrechts der Bundesrepublik Deutschland, 20. Auflage Heidelberg 1999, ISBN 3-8114-7499-5
- Verfassungsrecht und Privatrecht, Heidelberg 1988, ISBN 3-8114-8588-1
