= Hildegard Bentele =

German politician of the Christian Democratic Union (born 1967)

Hildegard Bentele MEP
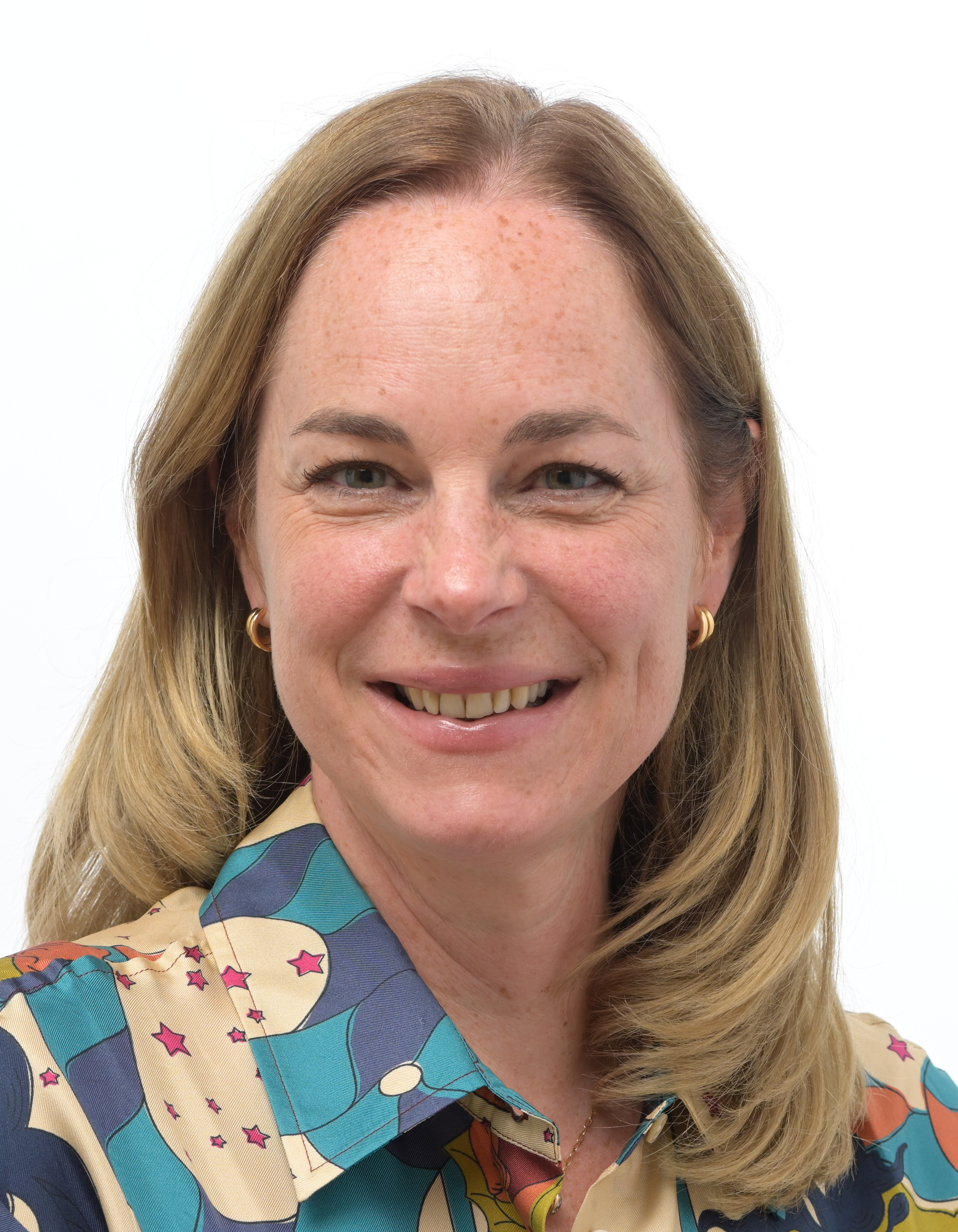

Member of the European Parliament for Germany
- Incumbent
- Assumed office 2 July 2019

Member of the Abgeordnetenhaus of Berlin
- In office 18 September 2011 – 1 July 2019
- Succeeded by: Markus Klaer

Personal details
- Born: 22 May 1976 (age 50) Ludwigsburg, West Germany
- Party: German: Christian Democratic Union; EU: European People's Party

Hildegard Bentele (born 22 May 1976 in Ludwigsburg) is a German politician of the Christian Democratic Union (CDU) who has been serving as a Member of the European Parliament since 2019.

== Early life and education ==
Bentele was born in Ludwigsburg. She graduated from the Margarete-Steiff-Gymnasium in Giengen in 1995. She subsequently studied political science, history and public law at the University of Heidelberg from 1995 until 1997. From 1997 to 1998 she studied at Sciences Po in Paris and until 1999 at the Otto Suhr Institute of the Free University of Berlin. During her studies, she completed internships at the Permanent Representation of Germany to the European Union and the European Parliament.

== Career in the diplomatic service ==
In 2002, Bentele joined the Federal Foreign Office and was, among other positions, an advisor on economic affairs and relations to the United States. From 2005 to 2008, she worked at the German embassies in Zagreb and Tehran.

Between 2010 and 2013 Bentele worked as a foreign policy advisor to Hans-Peter Friedrich and Gerda Hasselfeldt in their respective capacities as deputy chairs of the CDU/CSU parliamentary group in the German Parliament, a position for which she was granted leave of absence by the Federal Foreign Office.

== Political career ==
From the 2011 state elections until 2019, Bentele was a member of the State Parliament of Berlin. During her time in parliament, she served as her group's spokeswoman on European affairs from 2011 until 2016 and later deputy chairwoman under the leadership of Florian Graf.

Bentele has been a Member of the European Parliament since the 2019 European elections. In parliament, she has been serving on the Committee on Development (since 2019) and the Committee on Industry, Research and Energy (since 2020). Since 2021, she has been part of the Parliament's delegation to the Conference on the Future of Europe.

In addition to her committee assignments, Bentele is part of the Parliament's delegation for relations with Canada. She is also a member of the URBAN Intergroup.

In 2021, Bentele was part of the European Parliament’s official delegation to the United Nations Climate Change Conference (COP26).

In the negotiations to form a coalition government between the CDU and the Social Democratic Party (SPD) under the leadership of Kai Wegner following Berlin’s 2023 state elections, Bentele was part of her party’s delegation to the working group on European affairs.

== Personal life ==
Bentele is married to Croatian diplomat Ivan Bojanić. The couple have two children.
