= Peter Häberle =

German legal scholar (1934–2025)

Peter Häberle (13 May 1934 – 6 October 2025) was a German legal scholar who specialised in constitutional law.

== Life and career ==
Häberle was born in Göppingen, Baden-Württemberg on 13 May 1934, the son of Hugo Häberle, a medical doctor, and Ursula Häberle (born Riebensahm).

Häberle studied law in Tübingen, Bonn, Freiburg im Breisgau and Montpellier. In 1961 he received his juris doctor under supervision of Konrad Hesse at the faculty of law, Albert-Ludwigs-Universität Freiburg. His thesis, titled "Die Wesensgehaltgarantie des Art. 19 Abs. 2 Grundgesetz", became both influential and controversial.

In 1970 Häberle attained his habilitation in Freiburg im Breisgau with a work on "Öffentliches Interesse als juristisches Problem" (i.e., public interest as a legal problem). After deputizing as professor in Tübingen he became a professor of law in Marburg himself. Later he moved to the Universities of Augsburg and Bayreuth. He served also as visiting professor at the University of St. Gallen (1982–1999).

Häberle's works have been translated into 18 languages. He was honored by an international Festschrift for his 70th birthday.

Much like his academic teacher Konrad Hesse, Häberle stands in the tradition of the Rudolf Smend school of thought. He has publicly acknowledged this fact in a lot of his works.

In 1994 Peter Häberle received the honorary doctorate of the faculty of law of the Aristotle University of Thessaloniki, in 2000, 2003 and 2007 from the respective faculties in Granada, the Catholic University of Lima and the University of Lisbon. In 2005 the University of Brasília awarded him an honorary doctorate. Further honors have included the "Great officer of the Republic of Italia"-order, the medals of honor of the Constitutional courts in Rome and Lima, the German and the Bavarian cross of merit.

Häberle died in Munich on 6 October 2025, at the age of 91.

== Guttenberg plagiarism scandal ==
Peter Häberle supervised the 2006 doctoral thesis of German politician Karl-Theodor zu Guttenberg. Guttenberg's dissertation was later shown to contain copies of texts from the Neue Zürcher Zeitung, the Frankfurter Allgemeine Zeitung, a speech by his predecessor as defense minister, and many other sources, including his main supervisor, Häberle himself. The dissertation had been awarded a rare "summa cum laude" ("with highest honor"), as recommended by Häberle. However, the PhD degree was revoked in February 2011 for extensive violations of regulations concerning the citation of sources. Initially Häberle had defended the thesis of Guttenberg, whom he considered "one of his best students", against accusations of plagiarism, calling them "absurd". However, he later said that his first spontaneous reaction had been "too rash" and that he had not been aware of the extent of the flaws in Guttenberg's dissertation. Häberle said that these flaws were "severe" and "not acceptable". He did not address his own failure to identify the flaws of the dissertation.
