= Annette Schavan =

German politician (born 1955)

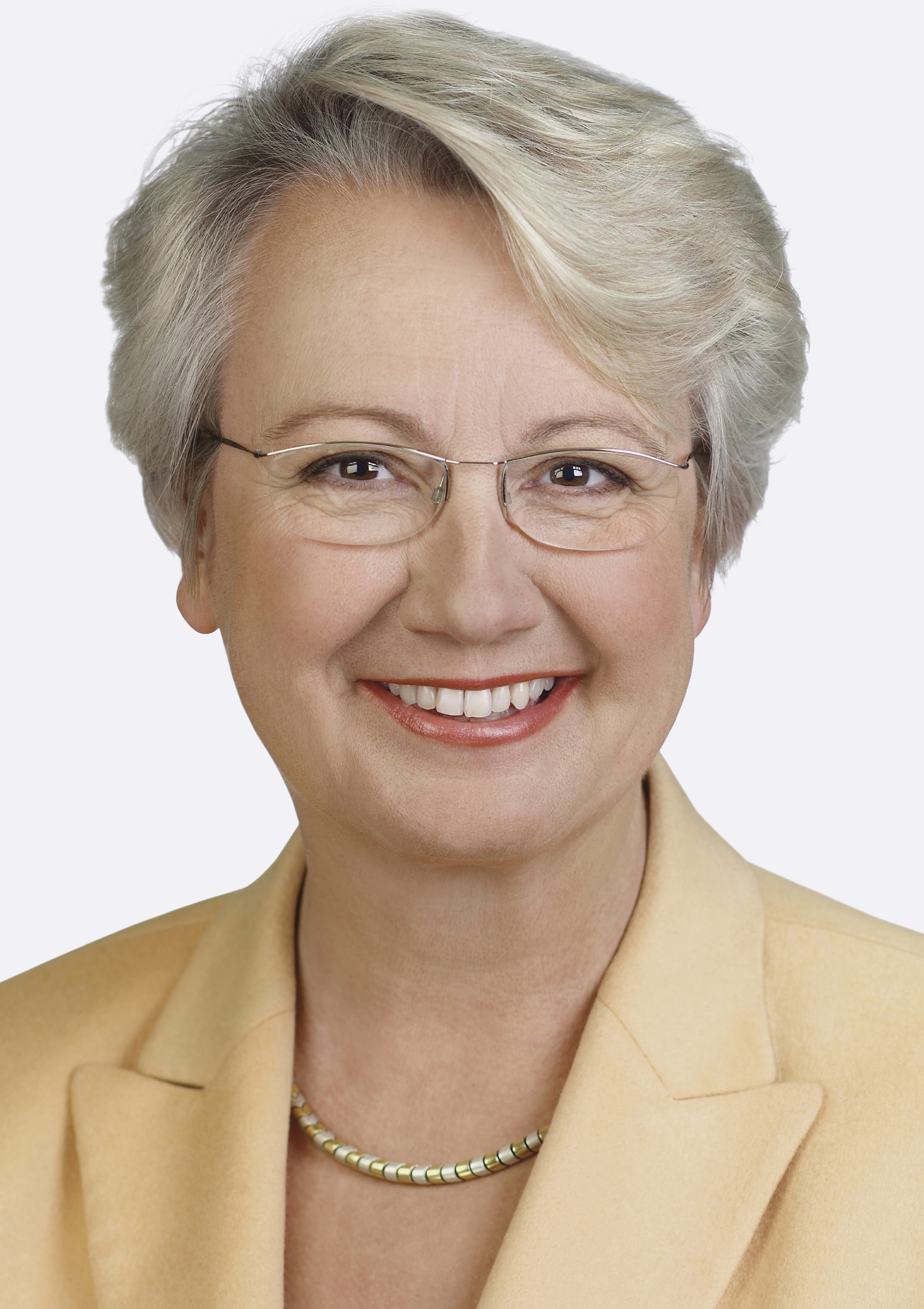
- Schavan in 2010

Minister of Education and Research
- In office 22 November 2005 – 14 February 2013
- Chancellor: Angela Merkel
- Preceded by: Edelgard Bulmahn
- Succeeded by: Johanna Wanka

Member of the Bundestag; for Ulm
- In office 18 October 2005 – 30 June 2014
- Preceded by: Heinz Seiffert
- Succeeded by: Waldemar Westermayer

Minister of Education, Youth and Sports of Baden-Württemberg
- In office 19 July 1995 – 5 October 2005
- Minister-President: Erwin Teufel; Günther Oettinger
- Preceded by: Marianne Schultz-Hector
- Succeeded by: Helmut Rau

Member of the; Landtag of Baden-Württemberg; for Bietigheim-Bissingen
- In office 12 June 2001 – 30 September 2005
- Preceded by: Manfred List
- Succeeded by: Manfred Hollenbach

Personal details
- Born: 10 June 1955 (age 71) Jüchen, West Germany
- Party: Christian Democratic Union
- Education: University of Bonn; University of Düsseldorf
- Profession: Theologian
- Website: annette-schavan.de

Annette Schavan (pronounced [aˈnɛtə ʃaˈvaːn]; born 10 June 1955) is a German politician of the Christian Democratic Union (CDU). She was the Federal Minister of Education and Research in the government of Chancellor Angela Merkel from 2005 to 2013, when she resigned following the revocation of her doctorate due to plagiarism. From 2014 until 2018 she served as the German Ambassador to the Holy See. From April 2018, she also briefly served as first German Ambassador to the Sovereign Military Order of Malta.

Throughout her political career, Schavan was widely known to be a friend and a confidante of Merkel's.

== Early life ==
Schavan was born in Jüchen on 10 June 1955.

== Political career ==
=== Career in state politics ===
From 1995 until 2005, Schavan served as State Minister of Cultural Affairs, Youth, and Sports for the German state of Baden-Württemberg in the governments of successive minister-president Erwin Teufel and Günther Oettinger. During this time, she oversaw school education in Baden-Württemberg. One controversy that erupted during this time was when a Muslim teacher was banned from wearing a head scarf in school, as that was interpreted as a religious symbol, while at the same time allowing Catholic nuns to wear their traditional habits. The argument was that the habits of nuns and monks have an official function, while a Muslim headscarf is optional.

Schavan was regarded as a possible Christian Democratic candidate for Germany's presidency in 2004, but Horst Köhler was nominated and elected instead. In 2005, she attempted to succeed Erwin Teufel as Minister-President of Baden-Württemberg, but she was defeated by her rival Günther Oettinger in the internal elections of the CDU. Oettinger's referendum win – with 60.6 percent of the vote versus 39.4 percent for Schavan – was widely seen at the time as a defeat for Teufel, who had promoted Schavan as his preferred successor.

Under the leadership of party chairwoman Angela Merkel, Schavan was re-elected vice-chairwoman of the CDU in November 2006, this time alongside minister-presidents Roland Koch, Jürgen Rüttgers and Christian Wulff.

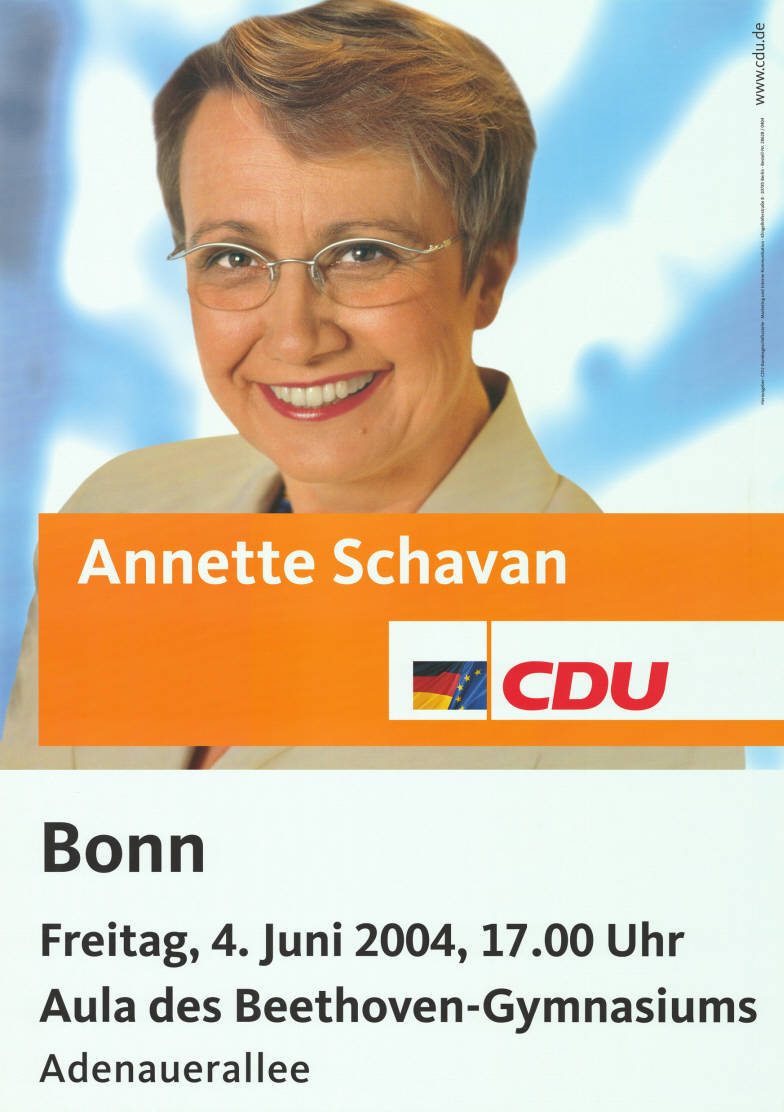
Schavan in 2004

=== Minister of Education and Research (2005–2013) ===
Schavan served as Federal Minister of Education and Research from 2005 to February 2013. Following the 2009 federal elections, she was part of the CDU/CSU team in the negotiations with the FDP on a coalition agreement. She led her party's delegation in the working group on education and research policy; her co-chair of the FDP was Andreas Pinkwart.

In an effort to increase the share of female university lecturers and tenured professors, Schavan introduced a €150 million equal-opportunities program under which the federal government paid the salary of between one and three additional posts for highly qualified female academics that proved a commitment to redressing the gender imbalance.

In 2010, Schavan led efforts to enlist imams educated at German universities to improve the integration of young Muslims. Under a plan devised by the German Council of Science and Humanities, imams were to be trained at two or three German universities, in accordance with the German curriculum. In addition to theology, the new preachers would also study education and community organizing. In a competition, the universities of Tübingen, Münster and Osnabrück were selected for the program.

On the occasion of the sixtieth anniversary of the diplomatic relations between Germany and India, Schavan participated in the first joint cabinet meeting of the two countries' governments in Delhi in May 2011.

In 2012, Schavan chaired the Joint Science Conference (GWK), a body which deals with all questions of research funding, science and research policy strategies and the science system that jointly affect the federal government and the 16 federal states.

Following her resignation, Schavan was succeeded by Johanna Wanka.

== Life after politics ==
In 2017, Schavan was one of the candidates considered to succeed Hans-Gert Pöttering as chair of the Konrad Adenauer Foundation (KAS) until she withdrew herself from consideration; instead, the role went to Norbert Lammert.

In April 2023, Schavan was one of the 22 personal guests at the ceremony in which Angela Merkel was decorated with the Grand Cross of the Order of Merit for special achievement by President Frank-Walter Steinmeier at Schloss Bellevue in Berlin.

== Plagiarism ==
Amid the plagiarism scandal that led to the resignation of Karl-Theodor zu Guttenberg as Minister of Defence of Germany on 1 March 2011, Schavan was quoted in Der Spiegel as saying that "intellectual theft is not a small thing". In 2012, a blogger with the pseudonym Robert Schmidt who is a member of the research-network VroniPlag Wiki alleged he had found plagiarism in Schavan's PhD thesis, entitled "Character and conscience – Studies on the conditions, necessities, and demands on the development of conscience in the present day." The University of Düsseldorf conducted an investigation into the plagiarism charge. Investigators found paraphrasing of secondary literature without naming the source in over 60 cases in the dissertation and thereby on 5 February 2013 revoked her doctorate degree because of "systematic and premeditated" deception.

On 9 February 2013, it was reported that chancellor Angela Merkel had accepted Annette Schavan's resignation. Schavan continued to deny any wrongdoing and pursued a court appeal against the process by which the university had revoked her doctorate. On 20 March 2014 a Düsseldorf court rejected her appeal, however.

== Other activities (selection) ==
- Hertie Foundation, Chair of the Board (since 2024), previously Member of the Board of Trustees
- Hans und Berthold Finkelstein Stiftung, Chair of the Advisory Board (since 2023)
- Foundation Remembrance, Responsibility and Future (EVZ), chairwoman of the Board of Trustees (since 2019)
- European Foundation for the Aachen Cathedral, chairwoman of the Board of Trustees (since 2018)
- Munich School of Philosophy, Member of the Board of Trustees
- German Cancer Research Center (DKFZ), Member of the Advisory Council
- Lindau Nobel Laureate Meetings, Member of the Honorary Senate
- Academy of the Roman Catholic Diocese of Rottenburg-Stuttgart, Member of the Board of Trustees
- German Coordinating-Council for Christian-Jewish Cooperation Organizations, Member of the Board of Trustees
- Hermann Kunst Foundation for the Promotion of New Testament Textual Research, Member of the Board of Trustees
- ZDF, Member of the Television Board (2010-2011)
- Max Planck Society (MPG), Member of the Senate (2005-2013)
- Volkswagen Foundation, Member of the Board of Trustees (2005-2013)
- Central Committee of German Catholics, Member (1991-2005)

== Political positions ==
Following the death of Pope John Paul II, Schavan – then serving as deputy chairperson of the Central Committee of German Catholics, the church's lay organisation – demanded that the "we need more lively local churches, and therefore also more autonomy [from Rome] for local parishes".

Ahead of the Christian Democrats' leadership election in 2018, Schavan publicly endorsed Annegret Kramp-Karrenbauer to succeed Angela Merkel as the party's chair.

For the 2021 national elections, Schaven endorsed Armin Laschet as the Christian Democrats' joint candidate to succeed Chancellor Angela Merkel.

== Recognition ==
- 2006 – Else Mayer Award
- 2009 – Honorary doctorate of Cairo University
- 2010 – Honorary doctorate of Tongji University
- 2011 – Honorary doctorate of Meiji University
- 2014 – Honorary doctorate of the University of Lübeck
