= Markus Klaer =

German politician (1968–2020)

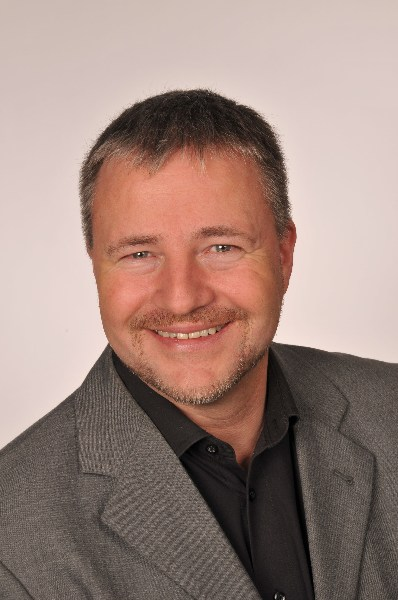
Markus Klaer in 2011

Markus Klaer (26 June 1968 – 21 May 2020) was a German politician, surveying engineer, and member of the Christian Democratic Union (CDU). Klaer served in the Abgeordnetenhaus of Berlin, the city's state parliament, from 2011 until 2016. He returned to the Abgeordnetenhaus from 1 August 2019 until his death on 28 May 2020.

== Biography ==
Klauer was originally from Geseke, North Rhine-Westphalia. He joined the Berlin branch of the Christian Democratic Union of Germany (CDU) in 1999. Klaer, who was based in Tempelhof, Berlin, began his political career in 2003, when he became chairman of the local CDU Alt-Tempelhof.

Klaer was elected to his first term in the Abgeordnetenhaus of Berlin from 2011 to 2016. He returned to the Abgeordnetenhaus on 1 August 2019, to succeed outgoing member Hildegard Bentele, who had been elected to the European Parliament. He remained in office until his death in May 2020. He served on the CDU's main and science committees in the Abgeordnetenhaus and chaired the gay and lesbian working group for the Berlin CDU.

Markus Klaer died unexpectedly in office on 21 May 2020, at the age of 51. His death was confirmed by Burkard Dregger, the leader of the opposition CDU in the Abgeordnetenhaus.
