= Silvana Koch-Mehrin =

German politician (born 1970)

Silvana Koch-Mehrin MEP
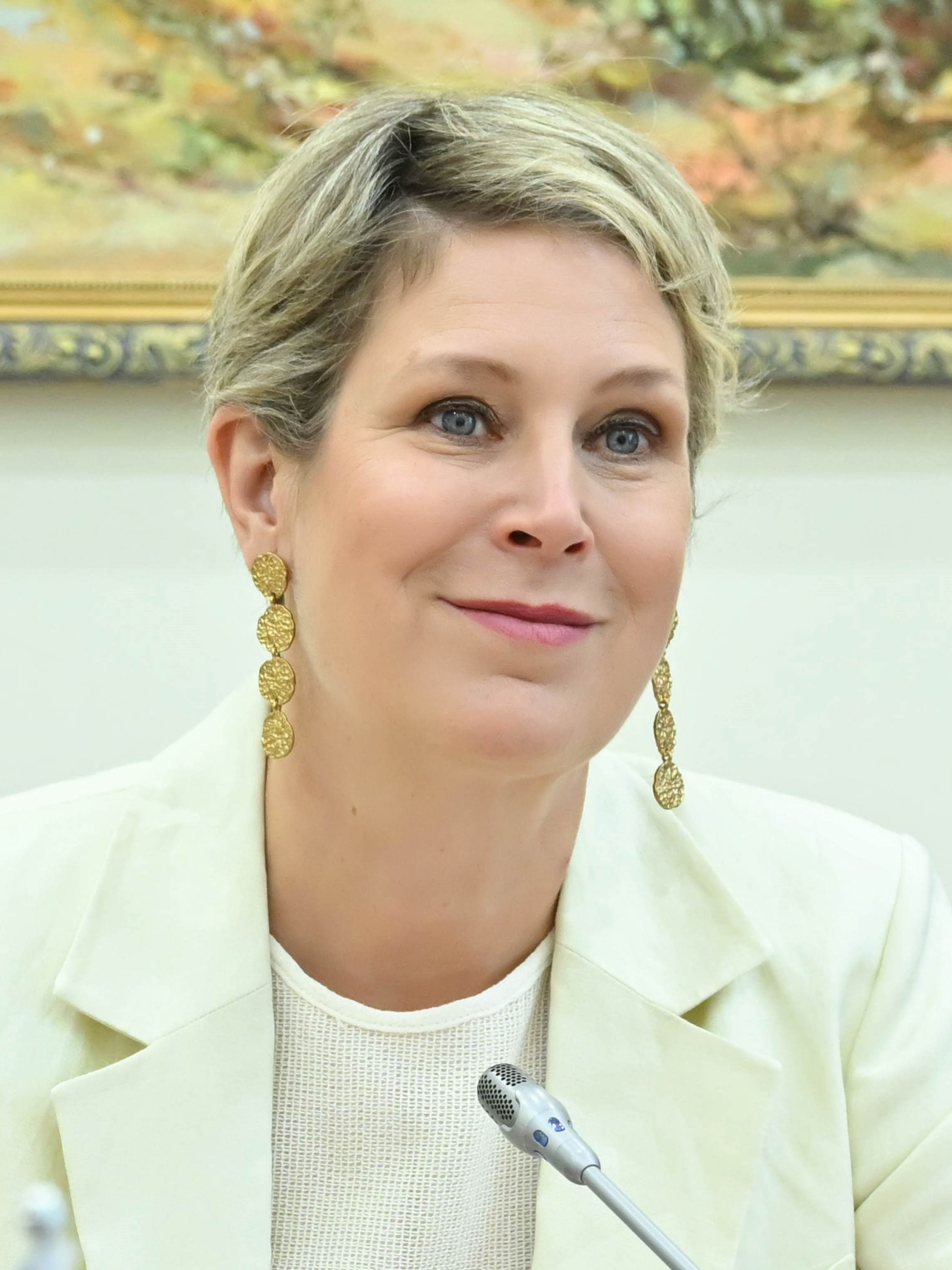
- Koch-Mehrin in 2023

Vice-President of the European Parliament
- In office 14 July 2009 – 10 May 2011
- President: Jerzy Buzek
- Preceded by: Janusz Onyszkiewicz
- Succeeded by: Giles Chichester

Member of the European Parliament
- In office 20 July 2004 – 30 June 2014

Personal details
- Born: 17 November 1970 (age 55) Wuppertal, West Germany (now Germany)
- Party: Free Democratic Party

Esther Silvana Koch-Mehrin (born 17 November 1970) is a German former politician of the Free Democratic Party of Germany who served as a Member of the European Parliament from 2004 to 2014.

== Early career ==
Koch-Mehrin was born in Wuppertal. In 1998, she founded her public affairs consultancy, Conseillé+Partners, together with Frank Schwalba-Hoth.

== Political career ==
Koch-Mehrin rose to the ranks of the federal party executive under the leadership of FDP chairman Wolfgang Gerhardt in 1999. Ahead of the 2004 European elections, the new chairman Guido Westerwelle decided to make her the party's top candidate and to run its campaign to re-enter the European Parliament for the first time in ten years; the FDP eventually won seven seats.

In parliament, Koch-Mehrin was a member of the European Parliament's Committee on Budgets. She also was a substitute member of the Committee on Budgetary Control and a member of the Delegation for relations with the Maghreb countries and the Arab Maghreb Union (including Libya). Until May 2009, Koch-Mehrin served as Vice Chairwoman of the Alliance of Liberals and Democrats for Europe.

In addition to her parliamentary work, Koch-Mehrin was a EU Representative to the Executive Board of W20, member of the Advisory Board of the Council of Women World Leaders (CWWL), and a member of the Young Global Leaders Network of the World Economic Forum (WEF).

In October 2012, Koch-Mehrin announced that she would not stand in the 2014 European elections but instead resign from active politics by the end of the parliamentary term.

== Controversy ==
=== Plagiarism ===
Like Karl-Theodor zu Guttenberg and Jorgo Chatzimarkakis's doctoral theses, Koch-Mehrin's 2001 thesis, titled 'Historical Currency Unions between Economy and Politics', was analysed by VroniPlag using a crowd-source effort, and she was accused of plagiarism. As a consequence of this, on 11 May 2011 she resigned as chairperson of the FDP in the European Parliament and as vice-president of the European Parliament, arguing that she wanted to end the strain the investigation put on her family.

She remained a member of the European Parliament, and continued to use the doctor title. On 15 June 2011 the University of Heidelberg officially rescinded her doctorate due to massive plagiarism. Only four days later she announced that she had become a full member of the Committee on Industry, Research and Energy. This provoked a hefty reaction from the Deutsche Forschungsgemeinschaft. The DFG President, Matthias Kleiner, stated that further membership of Koch-Mehrin in the European Parliament is not acceptable. Koch-Mehrin later announced that she would relinquish her seat on the committee.

Koch-Mehrin subsequently filed a legal suit against Heidelberg University´s decision to revoke her doctorate. First, she challenged the decision at the Administrative Court in Karlsruhe. In March 2013, the court rejected her action against the university, confirming that the level of plagiarism justified stripping her degree. Following this decision, she appealed to the Higher Administrative Court of Baden-Württemberg in Mannheim. However, on 3 February 2014, the Court permanently upheld the revocationof her doctorate, ruling that the university´s decision was lawful due to the systematic nature of the plagiarism.

=== Debate attendance ===
During the campaign for the 2009 European Parliament election, Frankfurter Allgemeine Zeitung (FAZ) criticised Koch-Mehrin for attending only 39% of the parliamentary debates, not counting maternity leave. She answered back and gave a statutory declaration that she had participated in 75% of the debates. The European Parliament then published a corrected number of 62%, with maternity leave taken into consideration. This figure would later be corrected to 75% without maternity leave, like she had stated earlier. Since giving a wrong statutory declaration is a criminal act, the European Parliament's administration reviewed additional attendance lists Koch-Mehrin provided. Mehrin's party urged a preliminary injunction against the FAZ, but withdrew it soon after, due to the fact of her stating a true statement.

== Later career ==
In 2013, Koch-Mehrin founded the Women in Parliaments a Global Forum (WIP), a worldwide network of female politicians. With headquartes in Brussles, WPL (new name: Women Political Leaders) operates as an independent, non-profit, post-partisan international foundation. Its mission is to increasing the number and influence of women in political leadership. The foundation has held numerous summits, of which the most recent one took place Montenegro. WPL has undertaken and published six studies so far; among them the most recent one titled Protecting Voices: Advancing Digital Safety for Women in Politics. Leadership Dialogue at the European Parliament.

== Other activities ==
- Walther Rathenau Institute, Member of the Board
- Apolitical Foundation, Member of the Global Advisor Network

== Political positions ==
In 2005, Koch-Mehrin called for all EU Member States to follow Germany in banning public displays of Nazi symbols. Her idea was roundly rejected by a number of countries who saw it as a restriction of free speech.

== Personal life ==
Koch-Mehrin met her partner James Candon at the end of a stage both completed at the European Commission. In 2020, she was diagnosed with breast cancer. Today she is considered cancer-free.

== See also ==
- 2004 European Parliament election in Germany
- 2009 European Parliament election in Germany
