= Christian Zander =

German politician (born 1978)

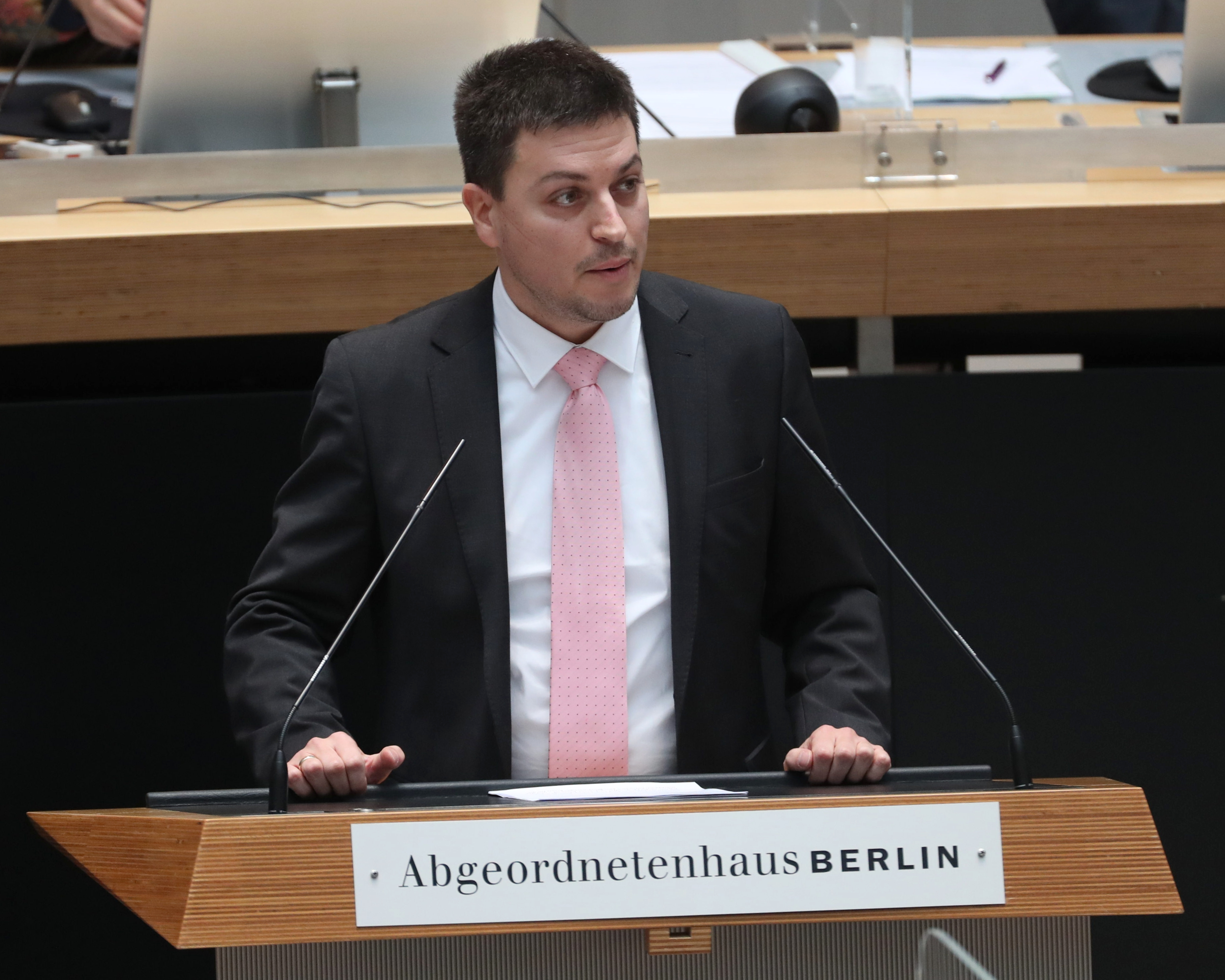
- Zander in 2021

Member of the Berlin House of Representatives
- Incumbent
- Assumed office 4 January 2021
- Preceded by: Florian Graf
- Constituency: Tempelhof-Schöneberg 7

Personal details
- Born: 29 April 1978 (age 48)
- Party: Christian Democratic Union (since 1997)

Christian Zander (born 29 April 1978) is a German politician serving as a member of the Berlin House of Representatives since 2021. From 2001 to 2021, he was a borough councillor of Tempelhof-Schöneberg. From 1999 to 2001, he was a borough councillor of Tempelhof.
