= Practical concordance =

German law on legal conflicts

The principle of practical concordance (German: Praktische Konkordanz) is a principle of German constitutional law to solve conflicting rules.
