= Andreas Fischer-Lescano =

German jurist

Andreas Fischer-Lescano (born September 14, 1972, in Bad Kreuznach) is a German legal scholar. He had a professorship at the University of Bremen from 2008 to 2022, where his research interests included public law, European law, international law, legal theory, and legal policy. He relocated to the University of Kassel in 2022 and assumed the chair in Transitional Justice.

He is the author of several influential monographs and articles.

He discovered that Minister of Defence Karl-Theodor zu Guttenberg had committed plagiarism in his doctoral dissertation, leading to his resignation in what became known as the Guttenberg plagiarism scandal.
