= Greek European Citizens =

Greek European Citizens Έλληνες Ευρωπαίοι Πολίτες
- President: Jorgo Chatzimarkakis
- Founder: Jorgo Chatzimarkakis
- Founded: 23 January 2014
- Dissolved: 9 January 2015
- Merged into: New Democracy
- Ideology: Liberalism; Classical liberalism Economic liberalism Pro-Europeanism
- Political position: Centre
- Colours: Purple; Orange

Website
- ellinespolites.gr (archived)

Greek European Citizens (Greek: Έλληνες Ευρωπαίοι Πολίτες) was a short-time Greek political party, founded by Jorgo Chatzimarkakis. Chatzimarkakis a German politician of Greek descent, Member of the European Parliament with the Free Democratic Party of Germany founded the party to take part in 2014 European Parliament Elections. He had aimed his party to become a "strong voice of Greeks" in European parliament. In election 2014 the party took 82,350 votes or 1.44% of the votes and ranked in 9th place. In early January 2015, the party announced that will cooperate with New Democracy for the upcoming general elections.

== Election results ==
=== European Parliament ===
Election year	# of overall votes	% of overall vote	# of overall seats won	+/-	Notes
2014	82,350	1.44 (#9)	0 / 21		
