= Frank Schwalba-Hoth =

German politician (born 1952)

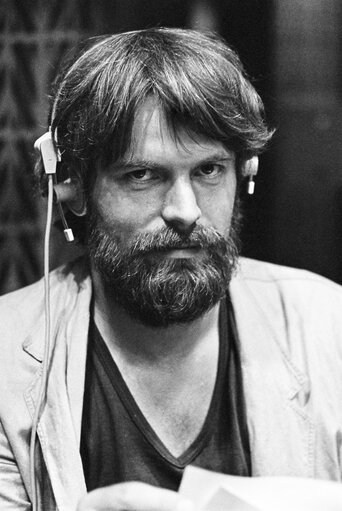

Member of the European Parliament
- In office 1984–1987

Personal details
- Born: 12 December 1952 (age 73) Hamburg, Germany
- Party: Green party

Frank Schwalba-Hoth (born 12 December 1952) is a German former politician, founding member of the German Greens, and former MEP.

== Politics ==
Schwalba-Hoth was born in Hamburg, Germany. After his graduation from high school at the Otto-Hahn-Gymnasium in Geesthacht and his military service, Schwalba-Hoth studied at the University of Marburg from 1974 to 1981. He started getting involved in politics as a student, founded the Grün-Bunt Alternative Liste (GBAL), the first green student union at a German university and became a member and later President (1979–1980) of the student parliament of Marburg University. He worked on initiatives such as the "3rd International Russell Tribunal on the human rights situation in the Federal Republic of Germany". He became in 1980 one of the founding members of the German Greens. In 1982 and 1983, Schwalba-Hoth was member of the Landtag of Hesse where his legislative proposal on teacher-training became the first green inspired legislation in a German Parliament ever.

During a reception for US troops stationed in Germany at the Landtag in Hesse he protested the stationing of US nuclear missiles in Germany by spilling his own blood on the medals of the commander of the V US Army Corps, General Paul S Williams.

=== European Parliament ===
Schwalba-Hoth was an MEP from 1984 to 1987, deputy President of the Petitions Committee, in 1986–87 he was one of two Co-Presidents of his political Group in the EP before stepping down because of the rotation principle ("Rotationsprinzip").

== Consulting & networking ==
Since Schwalba-Hoth left the European Parliament in 1987 he has been aconsultant, networker and mentor in Brussels. He was director of the Greenpeace liaison office. In 1998 he founded Conseillé+Partners together with Silvana Koch-Mehrin. Later he worked for the TACIS Programme of the European Commission in Central Asia, where for many years he supported the ratification of the Aarhus Convention in many countries. Since 2002, he has been an independent political analyst and strategist, as well as a networker and mentor.

Since 1989 Schwalba-Hoth has organised monthly networking events called Soirée Internationale, with some 20 participants from different professional, cultural, national and social backgrounds.

In 2011 and 2012 he published the EU Stakeholder directory, "a 900 page print and online directory of who's who and what's where in Brussels".

Since 2013 he is member of the board of directors (conseil d'administration) of the Brussels-based European Quarter Management Fund (EQuAMA).

Since 2014 he is member of the "EU Community Advisory Council" of the web-based newsletter EurActiv.

Since 2015 he is together with Roswitha Fessler-Ketteler, MEP Heidi Hautala, Vytautas Landsbergis and Aleksi Malmberg member of the advisory board of the Caucasian Chamber Orchestra association and its German "Förderverein".

Since 2016 he is member of the Advisory Board of the European Sustainable Cities Summit.

Since 2019, he is a member of the jury for the European Women's International Leadership Award (EWILA)

In July 2026, Schwalba-Hoth launched Frankly Brussels, a monthly English-language podcast of about fifteen minutes, released as video on YouTube and as audio on Spotify. Filmed by video journalist Kenan Erer, each episode is recorded outdoors rather than in a studio, at a location in Brussels linked to European history. The guests are people active in the Brussels and European scene, including academics, artists, diplomats, entrepreneurs, journalists, politicians and writers. The first episode, featuring former MEP Jürgen Klute, was recorded at the grave of Hergé; later guests have included poet and EU official Silvia Polidori and Mine Yildiz.

== Publications ==
- Fraktion der Grünen im Hessischen Landtag: Broschüre Die Würde einer Uniform ist antastbar- eine Dokumentation. August 1983.
- Lothar Bembenek; Frank Schwalba-Hoth: Hessen hinter Stacheldraht, verdrängt und vergessen: KZs, Lager, Aussenkommandos, Frankfurt, Eichborn Verlag, 1984.
- Katja Ridderbusch: Der Tross von Brüssel, Wien, Czernin Verlag, 2006. https://web.archive.org/web/20140221053120/http://www.katja-ridderbusch.com/en/author/books
- Frank Schwalba-Hoth: Stakeholder.eu, The Directory for Brussels, Berlin, Lexxion Verlag, 2011 and 2012.
