= Florian Graf (politician) =

German politician (born 1973)

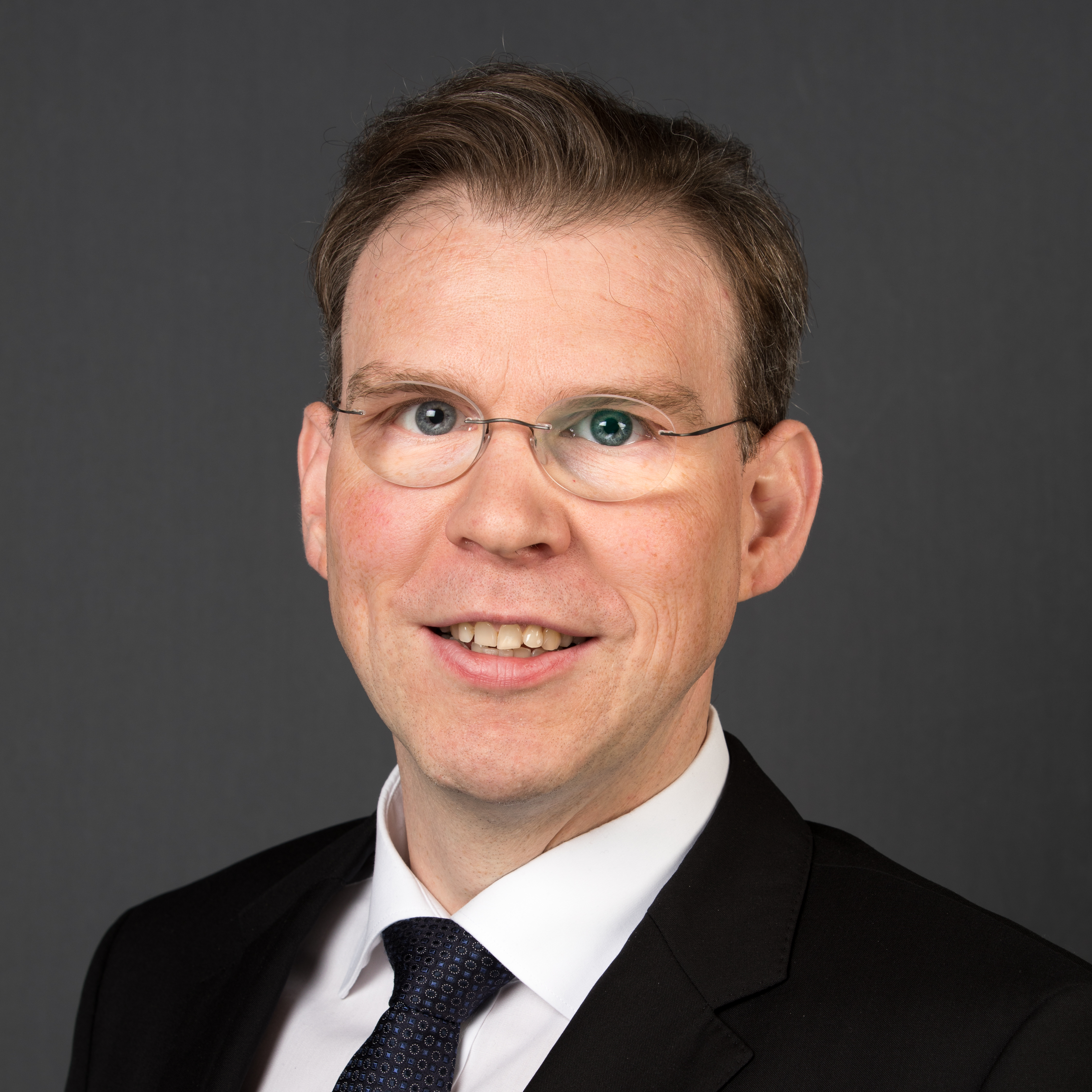
- Graf in 2017

Member of the Abgeordnetenhaus of Berlin
- In office 26 October 2006 – 31 December 2020
- Succeeded by: Christian Zander
- Constituency: Tempelhof-Schöneberg (2006–2011); Tempelhof-Schöneberg 6 (2011–2020)

Personal details
- Born: 5 October 1973 (age 52)
- Party: Christian Democratic Union (since 1995)

Florian Graf (born 5 October 1973) is a German politician serving as chief of the Senate Chancellery of Berlin since 2023. From 2006 to 2020, he was a member of the Abgeordnetenhaus of Berlin.
