= VroniPlag Wiki =

Platform for documenting plagiarism in academic publications

- Available in: German, English
- Owner: Fandom, Inc.
- Website: vroniplag.fandom.com/de
- Commercial: No
- Registration: Optional
- Launched: March 28, 2011
- Current status: Active
- Content license: Creative Commons Attribution-ShareAlike 3.0 Unported

VroniPlag Wiki is a wiki started 28 March 2011 at Wikia that examines and documents the extent of plagiarism in German doctoral theses.

== History ==
Following the revocation of Karl-Theodor zu Guttenberg's doctoral degree, the VroniPlag Wiki adopted the idea of the GuttenPlag Wiki. VroniPlag is named after the first thesis documented in it, the thesis submitted by Veronica Saß, daughter of German politician Edmund Stoiber. "Vroni" is a nickname in German for "Veronica".

== Modus operandi ==
Publication of a thesis consists of an overview that contains a "bar code" visualizing the amount of plagiarism, the exact bibliographic information of the theses (and if online, a link) and then a page overview that links to the fragments of plagiarism found on the page. Each fragment is classified as to the kind of plagiarism and must be verified by a second person before it is acceptable. Interesting parts are linked to separately and there is a final report published when the group feels the work is done.

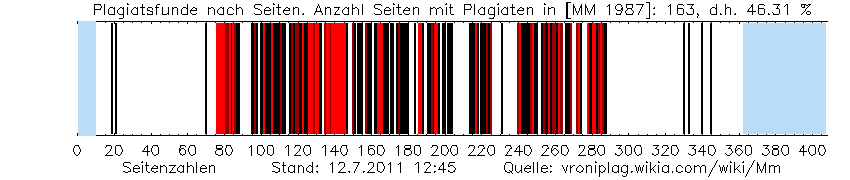
Visualization of the findings proved to be a key factor for the reception.

VroniPlag Wiki only publishes text parallel documentation openly with names of the authors on theses that have been found to contain serious plagiarism. Before publication, the office of academic integrity at the university in question is formally notified, as any revocation of title must be done by the university.

In addition to looking at dissertations, the text parallels in one habilitation and one book how to write scientifically.

== Current cases ==
As of February 2016, 152 dissertations, 8 habilitations, 1 master's thesis, and 1 book on scientific writing have been examined in detail on the site. The first seven were:

Dissertations that have been openly published on VroniPlag
Author of the Dissertation	Political Party	Member of	% of the pages found with plagiarism on date (Link)	Consequences	University
Margarita Mathiopoulos[de]	FDP	–	46.31% on July 12, 2011	Doctorate rescinded	Bonn
Uwe Brinkmann	SPD	–	25.98% on June 15, 2011	Doctorate rescinded	Hamburg
Bijan Djir-Sarai	FDP	Bundestag	44.44% on July 11, 2011	Doctorate rescinded	Cologne
Georgios Chatzimarkakis	FDP	European Parliament	71.58% on June 15, 2011	Doctorate rescinded	Bonn
Silvana Koch-Mehrin	FDP	European Parliament	34.33% on June 17, 2011	Doctorate rescinded	Heidelberg
Matthias Pröfrock	CDU	Landtag of Baden-Württemberg	53.15% on June 26, 2011	Doctorate rescinded	Tübingen
Veronica Saß	–	–	53.98% on May 25, 2011	Doctorate rescinded	Konstanz

Most of the plagiarism allegations made by VroniPlag led to investigations by the corresponding universities, and some have resulted in the revocation of the degree. Most of these revocations have held up in court. However, some universities disagreed with VroniPlag findings, even in cases of blatant plagiarism (between 40 and 70% of pages affected with plagiarism). The correct methods for dealing with plagiarism—and its prevention—remains an ongoing discussion in Germany.

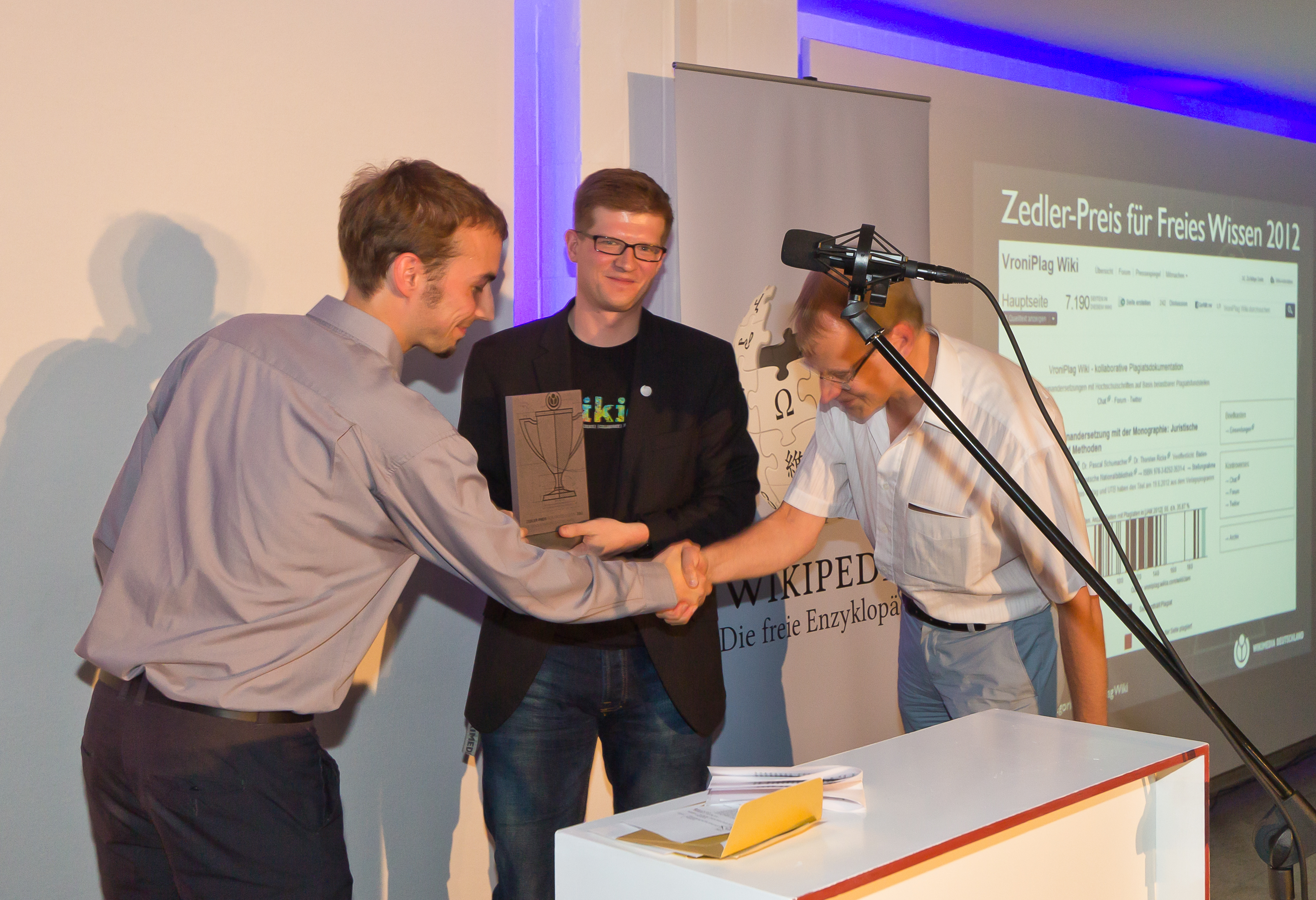
Awarding of the "Zedler-Preis für freies Wissen 2012" by Wikimedia Germany on July 1, 2012

Prominent cases of plagiarism continue to surface in Germany. At the University of Münster, a text book on scientific writing for lawyers was found to contain massive plagiarism. Ironically, even the chapter on plagiarism was plagiarized. While the book told students not to use Wikipedia, the book itself contained 18 text fragments from the German Wikipedia. The dissertations of two of the book's authors, who received their doctorates at Münster University, were found to show extreme text parallels.

VroniPlag was the first crowd sourcing phenomenon of its kind in Germany that has been referred to as an authoritative source in all major media channels in Germany. The plagiarism investigation project has triggered an extensive nationwide discussion about plagiarism and what represents appropriate consequences for plagiarists and universities. The project was awarded the Zedler Prize for Free Knowledge in the category External Knowledge Project of the year 2011 by the German Wikimedia on July 1, 2012.

Since September 2015, Minister of Defence Ursula von der Leyen's thesis is under formal investigation by her university after the wiki alleged plagiarism on more than 40% of its pages.

== See also ==
- Academic ranks in Germany
- Dissernet: a similar project in Russia
