= Jorgo Chatzimarkakis =

German politician (born 1966)

Georgios Chatzimarkakis
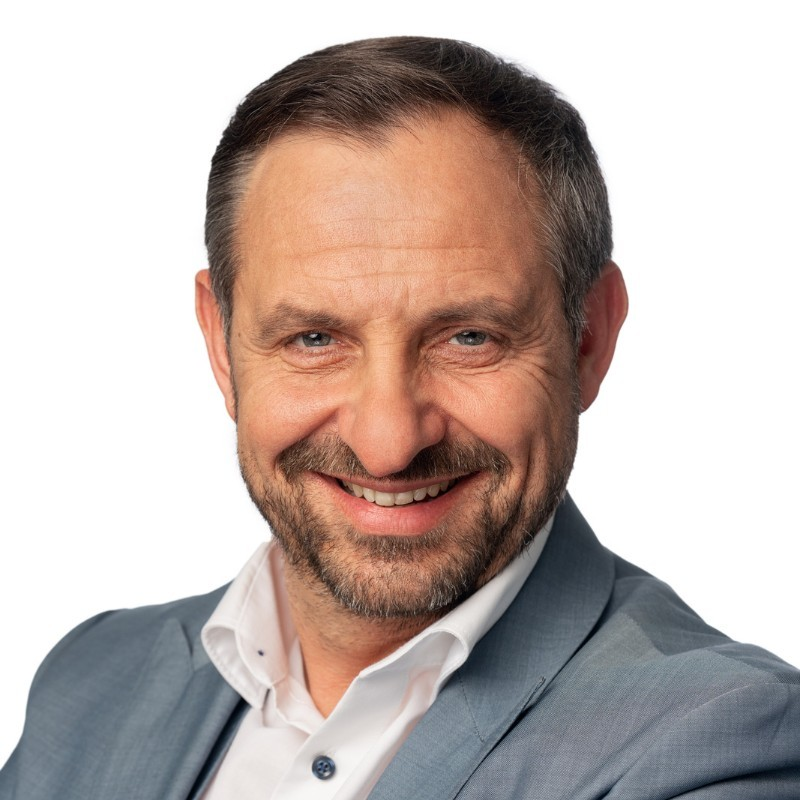
- Chatzimarkakis in 2021

Member of the European Parliament
- In office 2004–2014

Personal details
- Born: 21 April 1966 (age 60) Duisburg, Northrhine-Westphalia
- Party: Free Democratic Party of Germany; Greek European Citizens (Έλληνες Ευρωπαίοι Πολίτες) of Greece
- Children: 4
- Education: University of Bonn
- Occupation: CEO - Hydrogen Europe
- Profession: Political scientist

Jorgo Chatzimarkakis, officially Georgios Chatzimarkakis (Greek: Γεώργιος Χατζημαρκάκης; born 21 April 1966) is a German politician of Greek descent, former Member of the European Parliament with the Free Democratic Party of Germany (part of the Alliance of Liberals and Democrats for Europe). He was a 2014 European Parliament candidate for the newly formed party Greek European Citizens (Έλληνες Ευρωπαίοι Πολίτες) of Greece. He currently holds the position of Chief Executive Officer of the European Hydrogen Association "Hydrogen Europe".

== Education and career ==
Chatzimarkakis was born and grew up in Duisburg. In 1993 he graduated as M.A. in political science at the philosophical faculty of the University of Bonn. He supplemented his studies with a visiting research fellowship at St Antony's College, University of Oxford under the auspices of Ralf Dahrendorf in 1995. From 1993 to 1996 Chatzimarkakis worked as a science policy officer at the Bundestag.

From 1996 to 1998, he was member of the planning department of the Foreign Office of Germany. Chatzimarkakis held a lectureship at the University of Duisburg from 1997 to 2001, during which time he also worked on his doctoral thesis on Informational Globalism - A cooperation model of global governance using the example of electronic commerce (Informationeller Globalismus - Kooperationsmodell globaler Ordnungspolitik am Beispiel des Elektronischen Geschäftsverkehrs ). In 2011 the University of Bonn revoked his doctoral title. The committee found him guilty of plagiarism in his thesis.

Chatzimarkakis is married and has two daughters.

== Political activities ==
Chatzimarkakis is a member of the national executive committee of the FDP and of the European Liberal Democrat and Reform Party council since 1995. From 2002 to 2010 he was secretary-general of the FDP regional association of the Saarland. He is a founding member of the Dahrendorfkreis, a wing of the FDP that advocates for sustainable liberalism. After the FDP lost two regional elections in Rhineland-Palatinate and Baden-Württemberg, Chatzimarkakis was one of the main critics of the party leader Guido Westerwelle.

Chatzimarkakis has been a member of the European Parliament since July 2004 for the FDP party of Germany. In the 2014 European Parliament elections he stood for the newly formed Greek party Greek European Citizens. He currently sits on the European Parliament's Committee on Fisheries as well as on the Committee on Budgetary Control, for which he is a coordinator. He also chairs the Delegation of the European Union to the Republic of Macedonia. He is a supporter of the Spinelli Group.

From February 2016 Chatzimarkakis is the first permanent Secretary General of Hydrogen Europe. Hydrogen Europe (formerly known as NEW-IG) is an industry association representing almost 100 companies, both large and SMEs, working to promote hydrogen and fuel cells energy. The association partners with the European Commission and the research community in the public-private partnership "Fuel Cells and Hydrogen Joint Undertaking" (FCH JU) to accelerate the market introduction of these clean technologies in the energy and transport sectors.

== Greece ==
Chatzimarkakis wants Greece to stay in the Euro Zone. In September 2011, Vice Chancellor Philipp Rösler, wrote an article in the newspaper Die Welt, where he explained possible benefits of a Greek bankruptcy for the rest of the Eurozone. Chatzimarkakis criticized his party leader as not supporting investors to engage in Greece. Rösler was also heavily criticized by German media and major German politicians for his statement. Chatzimarkakis repeatedly criticised the austerity policy of the Troika, he argues it pauperizes the country. In May 2011, in German weekly DIE ZEIT, Chatzimarkakis published an opinion editorial in which he called for a European Marshall Plan for Greece called "Herkules Plan." The plan calls for investments in Health Tourism, Renewable Energies, Shipping and Information technology.

== Plagiarism ==
In 2000 Chatzimarkakis received a doctor's degree at the University of Bonn. However the crowdsourcing project VroniPlag found cases of alleged plagiarism in the thesis. In May 2011 the University announced that it was investigating the claims at the request of Chatzimarkakis himself and on 13 July the University announced that the doctorate would be revoked after finding that part of the thesis was plagiarised. Chatzimarkakis went to court against this decision but on 22 March 2012 the Verwaltungsgericht Köln dismissed Chatzimarkakis' action against the University of Bonn on the following grounds: "The Faculty has consistently held that the plaintiff was guilty of deception. In his doctoral thesis he adopted long passages verbatim from foreign works, without highlighting these clearly and in accordance with the rules of good scientific practice."

== Other activities ==
Before his political career in the European Parliament, Chatzimarkakis was managing director of the consultancy "polit data concept" and of the "Perl Academy". He is a founding member of the German-Greek Industrial Association (DHW) and was elected its president in 2004.
