= List of science fiction podcasts =

The following is a list of science fiction podcasts. The list contains podcasts that have been explicitly categorized as science fiction by reliable secondary sources that demonstrate each podcast's notability. The type of release can be either episodic or serial. The delivery of each podcast can vary significantly from a fully scripted audio drama to an entirely improvised skit. Other styles include conversational, interview, or narrated short stories. The contents of each podcast can vary from stories of fiction to nonfiction discussions revolving around fiction in media.

== List ==
Podcast	Year	Host(s)/Narrator(s)/Starring	Produced by	Ref
A Winkle in Time	2019	Marcus Haugen	Independent	
Black Box	2020–present	Gus Sorola and Chris Demarais	Rooster Teeth	
Hyacinth Disaster	2017	David Carlson	Independent	
Wolf 359	2014–2017	Zach Valenti, Emma Sherr-Ziarko, Michaela Swee, Cecilia Lynn-Jacobs, Zach Libresco, Noah Masur, Michelle Agresti, Scotty Shoemaker, and Ariela Rotenberg	Kinda Evil Genius Productions	
Arca-45672	2019–present	Claire Scherzinger	Erudition Media	
Voyage to the Stars	2019–present	Colton Dunn, Felicia Day, Janet Varney, and Steve Berg	Earwolf	
Electric Easy	2021–present	Mason Gooding	QCODE	
SAYER	2014–present	Adam Bash	GeeklyInc	
Liberty	2015–present	K. A. Statz and Travis Vengroff	Fool and Scholar Productions	
Chrysalis	2020–present	Michelle Quist	Independent	
Imaginary Worlds	2014–present	Eric Molinsky	Independent	
Eye on Sci-Fi	2019–present	Rod T. Faulkner	The 7th Matrix	
Our Opinions Are Correct	2018–present	Annalee Newitz and Charlie Jane Anders	Independent	
Welcome to Night Vale	2012–present	Joseph Fink and Jeffrey Cranor	Night Vale Presents	
Andromeda	2019	Rebecca Carey and Kylie Moss	Independent	
Wellspring	2019	Darnell Pierre Benjamin, Audrey Bertaux, Billy Chace, Jeremy Dubin, Kimberly Gilbert, Candice Handy, Jennifer Joplin, and Allyson West	Independent	
The Apocrypha Chronicles	2021	Rae Takei, Renae Morriseau, and Mela Pietropaolo	re:Naissance Opera	
Girl in Space	2017–present	Sarah Rhea Werner	Independent	
Sword and Laser	2008–present	Tom Merritt and Veronica Belmont	Independent	
Steal the Stars	2017–present	Ashlie Atkinson, Sean Williams, Jorge Cordova, and Brittany Williams	Tor Labs, Gideon Media, Macmillan	
Clarkesworld Magazine	2008–present	Kate Baker	Clarkesworld	
Immunities	2017–present	Bob Koester	Dueling Genre Productions	
The Cipher	2020–present	Anya Chalotra and Chance Perdomo	BBC Sounds	
Forest 404	2019	Pearl Mackie, Tanya Moodie and Pippa Haywood	BBC Sounds	
Mission to Zyxx	2017–2022	Jeremy Bent, Alden Ford, Allie Kokesh, Seth Lind, Winston Noel, and Moujan Zolfaghari	Zyxx Quadrant	
Illusionoid	2011–2018	Paul Bates, Lee Smart, and Nug Nahrgang	Independent	
Stellar Firma	2019–2021	Tim Meredith and Ben Meredith	Rusty Quill	
The Message	2015	Annapurna Sriram, Kathy Keane, Robert Stanton, Meryl Jones Williams, Gideon Glick, Emma Galvin, Meetu Chilana, Brian Haley, Gene Jones, and Darius Homayoun	Panoply Media and General Electric	
LifeAfter	2016	Annapurna Sriram, Kathy Keane, Robert Stanton, Meryl Jones Williams, Gideon Glick, Emma Galvin, Meetu Chilana, Brian Haley, Gene Jones, and Darius Homayoun	Panoply Media and General Electric	
Hypnopolis	2020–present	Saskia de Brauw	BMW	
I.T. > Sci-Fi	2016	Chuck and Ravi	VMware	
We Are Not Alone	2014–present	Andrew Fletcher, Lisa Thrower, Jon Thrower, and Verity Neeves	Independent	
Fantastic stories and where to find them	2019–present	Gabriele Blum, Robert Frank, Wolfgang Wagner and Vanida Karun	Argon	
Six Minutes	2018–present	Shahadi Wright Joseph, Zeph Maffei, and Lily Brooks O’Briant	Gen-Z Media	
Historynauts	2021–present	McKenzie Harms, Josiah Mustaleski, and Ethan Turbyfill	Wonkybot Studios	
The Unexplainable Disappearance of Mars Patel	2016–present	Jaiya Chetram, Natalie Mehl, and Kate Wolfson	Gen-Z Media	
The Alien Adventures of Finn Caspian	2016–present	Jonathan Messinger and Griffin Messinger	Gen-Z Media	
The Bright Sessions	2015–2019	Lauren Shippen and Julia Morizawa	Atypical Artists	
The AM Archives	2021	Lauren Shippen and Julia Morizawa	Atypical Artists	
The College Tapes	2021–present	Briggon Snow	Atypical Artists	
Earth Break	2019	Jenny Slate	Skylark Media	
There Be Monsters	2020–present	John Boyega and Darren Criss	iHeartRadio	
From Now	2020–present	Rhys Wakefield and William Day Frank	QCODE	
The Oyster	2020–present	Logan Browning, Mamoudou Athie, and Carla Gugino	The Paragon Collective	
In Astra	2020–present	Cole Ramirez	Independent	
SFF Yeah!	2017–present	Sharifah and Jenn	Book Riot	
Hugos There	2017–present	Seth Heasley	Independent	
372 Pages We’ll never Get Back	2017–present	Conor Lastowka and Michael J. Nelson	Independent	
Flash Forward	2015–present	Rose Eveleth and Julia Llinas Goodman	Independent	
Spectology: The Sci-Fi Book Club Podcast	2018–present	Adrian & Matt	Independent	
The SFF Audio Podcast	2020–present	Jesse Willis	SFF Audio	
Newcomers	2020	Lauren Lapkus and Nicole Byer	Art19	
Marsfall	2017–present	Sam Boase-Miller, Dan Lovley, and Shannon Lovley	Independent	
The Left Right Game	2020–present	Tessa Thompson	QCODE	
Within the Wires	2016–present	Janina Matthewson, Rima Te Wiata, Lee LeBreton, Mona Grenne, Amira Darwish, Norma Butikofer, Leah Minto, April Ortiz, Joey Rizzolo	Night Vale Presents	
NULL/VOID	2020–present	Cole Burkhardt	Independent	
Murmurs	2020	Various	BBC Sounds	
Black Friday	2019–present	Tycho Newman	Independent	
A World Where	2019–present	Ani Rider and H.K. Goldstein	Independent	
Gay Future	2018–present	Connor Wright, Christina Friel, and Ben Lapidus	Gay Future Productions	
The Great Chameleon War	2020	Justin Hellstrom	Independent	
Fun City	2019–present	Jenn de la Vega, Nick Guercio, Shannon Odell, and Bijan Stephen	Fun City Ventures	
Dreambound	2020–present	Sena Bryer	Independent	
Paired	2019–present	Liz Anderson	Independent	
The Rest Is Electric	2020–present	Nicola and Michael Wanless	Independent	
The Second Oil Age	2019	Robert Lamb	iHeartRadio	
Cryptids	2019–present	Alexander V. Thompson, Marianna McClellan, William McNulty, Jenna Krasowski, Logan Preston Hale, Chris Clavelli, Sarah Kinsey, Meryl Jones Williams, and Shannon Spangler	Wild Obscura	
Escape Pod	2015–present	Tina Connolly and Alasdair Stuart	Escape Artists, Inc	
Limetown	2015–2018	Zack Akers and Skip Bronkie	Two-Up	
Janus Descending	2018–2019	Jordan Cobb and Anthony Olivieri	No Such Thing Productions	
Case 63	2022	Julianne Moore and Oscar Isaac	Gimlet Media	
Midst	2020–present	Third Person	Third Person Productions (2020–22); Metapigeon (2023)	
The Deca Tapes	2019	Lex Noteboom	Rusty Quill	
Moonbase Theta, Out	2018	D.J. Sylvis	Monkeyman Productions	
The Dex Legacy	2024–present	Emily Inkpen	Independent	

== See also ==
- Science fiction
- Science fiction film
- Science fiction on television
- History of science fiction
- Outline of science fiction
