= Andy Bowers =

American radio journalist

Andy Bowers (born April 1, 1964) is an American radio journalist and podcaster, and is the co-founder and former chief content officer of Panoply Media, a podcasting production and services company owned by The Slate Group. After working as a White House and foreign correspondent for NPR during the 1990s, Bowers joined Slate in 2003, and founded the magazine's podcasts in 2005. The growth of the Slate podcasting network led the magazine's parent company to create Panoply in 2015, though Panoply closed its content arm in 2018.

== Early life and education ==
Andrew Bowers, known professionally as Andy, grew up in Los Angeles, CA, the child of screenwriter William Bowers and costume designer Marjorie Bowers. In 1986, Bowers graduated from Yale University with a B.A. degree.

== Career ==
Bowers began working as a producer for NPR's All Things Considered shortly after graduating from college in 1986. He was a member of the original staff of Weekend Edition Sunday when it launched in 1987, serving as the program's first director. He also worked as a reporter at WBUR in Boston, before being hired as a White House and congressional reporter at NPR in 1991.

In 1994, Bowers was appointed NPR's London bureau chief. While based in London, he frequently covered the Yugoslav Wars. In 1996, Bowers became NPR's Moscow bureau chief, and in 1998 became a national correspondent based in NPR's Los Angeles bureau.

Bowers joined Slate in 2003, although he continued to work at NPR's Culver City, California, facility as Slate's lead producer on the newsmagazine Day to Day, which was a co-production between NPR and Slate.

On July 15, 2005, Bowers launched the first Slate podcast, which consisted of Bowers reading a Slate article aloud from the closet of his Los Angeles home. In late 2005, Bowers created the Slate Political Gabfest, which became the magazine's flagship talk show and led to the formation of a network of similar programs include the Culture Gabfest, Hang Up and Listen, the Double X Gabfest, and the parenting show Mom and Dad Are Fighting Also in 2005, Bowers launched a personal podcast with his five-year-old daughter called Molly and the Sugar Monster, a dramatized podcasts for children.

In 2014, Bowers hired Mike Pesca from NPR to create a daily news, culture, and opinion podcast called The Gist.

In 2015, Bowers co-founded Panoply Media, The company worked with the New York Times, the Wall Street Journal, Vox, Politico, New York Magazine, Vanity Fair, Inc., Buzzfeed, Malcolm Gladwell, Gretchen Rubin, General Electric, Starbucks, and numerous others. Panoply also owned and operated a podcast hosting and ad insertion platform called Megaphone, which was subsequently acquired by Spotify in 2020. On October 3, 2017, Panoply announced their launch of Pinna, a podcast subscription service aimed at children.

== Personal life ==
As of 2017, Bowers is a member of the duPont/Columbia Awards jury.

He is married to the science journalist Kathryn Bowers, co-author of the New York Times bestseller Zoobiquity. They have one daughter and live in New York.
