= Moonbase Theta, Out =

Science fiction podcast

- Genre: Science Fiction
- Language: English

Cast and voices
- Hosted by: D.J. Sylvis

Production
- Length: 10–30 Minutes

Publication
- No. of seasons: 3
- No. of episodes: 80
- Original release: November 12, 2018
- Provider: Monkeyman Productions

Related
- Related shows: Wolf 359
- Website: monkeymanproductions.com/moonbase-theta-out/

Moonbase Theta, Out is a science fiction podcast created by D.J. Sylvis and produced by Monkeyman Productions.

== Background ==
The story follows the crew of a decommissioned moonbase as they begin to shutdown the base and prepare to leave. The majority of the moonbase's crew is in cryostasis while only five crew members are awake to keep things running. The crew have twenty weeks to completely shutdown and evacuate the moonbase. Each episode is made up of the audio reports that Roger Bragado-Fischer sends to earth at the end of each week. Bragado-Fischer also adds short messages to his husband, Alexandre, at the end of each report. The show contains dystopic themes and provides commentary on the negative impacts of capitalism.

Moonbase Theta, Out was one of the first fifteen programs included in The Fable & Folly Network.

== Format ==
Each episode in the first season averages about five minutes; in later seasons the episodes are longer. There are twenty-one episodes in the first season.

=== Cast and crew ===
D.J. Sylvis, Tina Daniels and Cass McPhee are the producers of the show.

- Leeman Kessler as Roger Bragado-Fischer
- Cass McPhee as Michell L'Anglois
- Jen Ponton as Tumnus
- Elissa Park as Nessa Cheong
- Tina Daniels as Wilder
- Tau Zaman as Ashwini Ray
- Gabriel Taneko as Alexandre Bragado-Fischer

== Awards ==
Award	Date	Category	Result	Ref.
Webby Awards	2020	Scripted (Fiction)	Honoree	
AudioVerse Awards	2020	Writing of an Audio Play Production	Finalist	
AudioVerse Awards	2021	Audio Play Production	Finalist	

== See also ==
- List of science fiction podcasts
