= Voyage to the Stars =

Sci-fi comedy podcast and comic book

- Genre: Science fiction podcast
- Format: Audio drama
- Language: English

Creative team
- Created by: Ryan Copple
- Written by: Ryan Copple

Cast and voices
- Starring: Kirsten Vangsness; Felicia Day
- Voices: Colton Dunn; Felicia Day; Janet Varney; Steve Berg

Production
- Production: Steven Ray Morris
- Length: 30–45 minutes

Publication
- No. of seasons: 3
- No. of episodes: 60
- Original release: February 12, 2019
- Provider: Madison Wells Media; Earwolf
- Updates: Weekly

Related
- Website: www.voyagetothestars.net

Voyage to the Stars is a science fiction and improvised comedy podcast written and produced by Ryan Copple. The show starred Felicia Day and Kirsten Vangsness and was a production of Madison Wells Media in partnership with Earwolf. The show was later adapted into a four-part comic book mini-series of the same name published by IDW Publishing, illustrated by Connie Daidone, and written by James Asmus.

== Background ==
The podcast's first episode premiered on February 12, 2019. The show was written and produced by Ryan Copple with audio production by Steven Ray Morris. The show is a Madison Wells Media production in partnership with Earwolf. According to Jeff Spry of Syfy Wire, the show was regularly among the top 100 comedy shows, received 2.5 million downloads, and had over 100,000 viewers on Twitch within the first year of production. The show is an improvised science fiction comedy that satirizes the tropes typically used in the genre. Felicia Day and Kristen Vangsness starred in the show. Season two was a 26 part series that was launched in September 2019.

== Plot ==
The story follows a space-captain named Tucker Lentz, a mechanic named Stew Merkel, an artificial intelligence named Sorry, and a science officer named Elsa Rankfort. The characters travel to various planets throughout the first season causing problems wherever they go. In one of the episodes, the artificial intelligence responsible for flying the spaceship decides that it needs to exterminate the crew who spend the episode attempting to talk the artificial intelligence out of killing them.

=== Characters ===
- Colton Dunn as Tucker Lentz
- Felicia Day as Elsa Rankfort
- Steve Berg as Stew Merkel
- Janet Varney as Sorry the A.I.

== Adaption ==
The show was adapted into a four-part comic book mini-series published by IDW Publishing, illustrated by Connie Daidone, and written by James Asmus. The first issue was released on August 19, 2020 and two of the covers for the first issue were illustrated by Freddie Williams II. Ed Fortune of Starburst Magazine critiqued the comic book for leaning too heavily on dialogue saying that the "art-style does a lot of the heavy lifting ... it’s just a pity it’s buried under so many word balloons." The plot of the comic book follows a group of characters who leave a dying earth and attempt to defeat the "Nothing."

== See also ==
- List of science fiction podcasts
