= MWM (entertainment company) =

American film production company

- Type: Private
- Industry: Entertainment
- Predecessor: OddLot Entertainment
- Founded: 2015
- Founders: Gigi Pritzker, Clint Kisker
- Headquarters: Los Angeles, California, U.S.
- Area served: Worldwide
- Divisions: MWM Studios; MWM Live; MWM Interactive; MWM Universe
- Website: www.madisonwellsmedia.com

MWM (formerly known as Madison Wells Media) is an American diversified entertainment company. Founded by Gigi Pritzker and Clint Kisker in 2015, MWM produces film, television, live theater, podcasts, and interactive experiences.

== History ==
Pritzker sought to "take advantage of a landscape that was rapidly changing and valuing 'content' in new ways," to "focus on storytellers in a way content never has before." MWM intended to create films, theater productions, and VR experiences under one umbrella to "expand and grow the IP that was born in any one of those units" through cross-pollination. Named after Madison and Wells Streets in Chicago, where Pritzker's great-grandfather sold newspapers when he was 12, MWM launched in November 2015.

At the time of its founding, MWM operated under the banners of OddLot Entertainment (film and television), Reality One (interactive), and Relevant Live (theater). In 2017, to streamline its operations and increase flexibility across its multiple platforms, the divisions were brought together, and Reality One and Relevant Live were rebranded respectively as MWM Interactive and MWM Live. In November 2017, Oddlot was renamed MWM Studios. MWM Universe, an IP-focused division of MWM that acquires and develops properties across media including film, TV, gaming, comics and books, was established in 2018 when they partnered with Chicago-based artist Hebru Brantley and his Angry Hero Productions to create fully immersive storyworlds.

== MWM Studios ==
MWM Studios, a division of MWM, teams with storytellers to produce feature films and television programming and develops, finances and arranges global distribution for its original content. The studio, led by Rachel Shane, CCO, and COO Adrian Alperovich, has produced films such as the Golden Globe and Academy Award-nominated Hell or High Water and the Emmy Award-winning television series Genius. Its adaptation of Jonathan Lethem's Motherless Brooklyn (written by, directed, and starring Edward Norton) was released in November, 2019.

=== Filmography ===
Motherless Brooklyn
21 Bridges
My Spy
Hell or High Water
Drive
Genius: Picasso
Landline
Genius: Einstein
Ender's Game
Rosewater
Rabbit Hole
The Way, Way Back
Genius: Aretha
The Eyes of Tammy Faye
Prime Minister
Nonnas
Miss You, Love You

== MWM Universe ==
Established in 2018, the IP-focused division of the company, MWM Universe, acquires IP and builds out franchisable story worlds, acts as a strategic partner to MWM investment companies including Wonderstorm.

=== Projects ===
Voyage To The Stars
The Dragon Prince
Nevermore Park

== MWM Interactive ==
The interactive division, previously known as MWM Immersive, created and published video games and produces virtual reality experiences. MWM announced its expansion into video game publishing on September 4, 2019 and closed its doors on June 28, 2022.

=== VR Projects ===
War Remains
Chained: A Victorian Nightmare
Groundhog Day: Like Father Like Son
SoKrispy Daydreams

=== Game Titles ===
Creature in the Well

Mundaun

== MWM Live ==
MWM Live is the live global entertainment division of MWM. It is led by executive producer Jamie Forshaw, formerly the VP of Production for Andrew Lloyd Weber's Really Useful Group. MWM Live has developed and produced projects such as the Broadway musical, Hadestown, and Million Dollar Quartet, which inspired the CMT series Sun Records.

=== Plays and musicals ===
Hadestown
The Inheritance
Million Dollar Quartet
Company (2021 revival)
Red Roses, Green Gold
Snapshots

== Selected awards and nominations ==
=== Academy Awards ===
Title and year	Category	Recipient(s) and nominee(s)	Result	Ref.
Hell or High Water 2017	Best Picture	Carla Hacken and Julie Yorn	Nominated	
Hell or High Water 2017	Best Supporting Actor	Jeff Bridges	Nominated	
Hell or High Water 2017	Best Original Screenplay	Taylor Sheridan	Nominated	
Hell or High Water 2017	Best Film Editing	Jake Roberts	Nominated	
Drive 2012	Best Sound Editing	Lon Bender and Victor Ray Ennis	Nominated	
Rabbit Hole 2010	Best Actress	Nicole Kidman	Nominated	

=== British Academy Film Awards ===
Title and year	Category	Recipient(s) and nominee(s)	Result	Ref.
Hell or High Water 2017	Best Actor in a Supporting Role	Jeff Bridges	Nominated	
Hell or High Water 2017	Best Original Screenplay	Taylor Sheridan	Nominated	
Hell or High Water 2017	Best Cinematography	Giles Nuttgens	Nominated	
Drive 2012	Best Film	Drive	Nominated	
Drive 2012	Best Director	Nicolas Winding Refn	Nominated	
Drive 2012	Best Supporting Actress	Carey Mulligan	Nominated	
Drive 2012	Best Editing	Matthew Newman	Nominated	

=== Emmy Awards ===
Title and year	Category	Recipient(s) and nominee(s)	Result	Ref.
Genius 2018	Outstanding Limited Series	Genius: Picasso	Nominated	
Genius 2018	Outstanding Lead Actor in a Limited Series or Movie	Antonio Banderas	Nominated	
Genius 2018	Outstanding Cinematography for a Limited; Series or Movie	Mathias Herndl (for "Chapter One")	Won	
Genius; 2017	Outstanding Limited Series	Genius: Picasso	Nominated	
Genius; 2017	Outstanding Lead Actor in a Limited Series or Movie	Geoffrey Rush	Nominated	
Genius; 2017	Outstanding Directing for a Limited Series, Movie, or Dramatic Special	Ron Howard	Nominated	

=== Golden Globe Awards ===
Title and year	Category	Recipient(s) and nominee(s)	Result	Ref.
Motherless Brooklyn 2019	Best Soundtrack for a Motion Picture	n/a	Nominated	
Genius: Picasso 2018	Best Performance by an Actor in a Limited Series or Motion Picture Made for Television	Antonio Banderas	Nominated	
Genius: Picasso 2017	Best Actor Miniseries or Television Film	Geoffrey Rush	Nominated	
Hell or High Water 2016	Best Screenplay	Taylor Sheridan	Nominated	
Drive 2012	Best Supporting Actor in a Motion Picture	Albert Brooks	Nominated	
Drive 2012	Best Director	Nicolas Winding Refn	Nominated	
Drive 2012	Best Adapted Screenplay	Hossein Amini	Nominated	
Drive 2012	Best Cinematography	Newton Thomas Sigel	Nominated	
Drive 2012	Best Original Score	Cliff Martinez	Nominated	
