= David Plotz =

American journalist (born 1970)

David A. Plotz
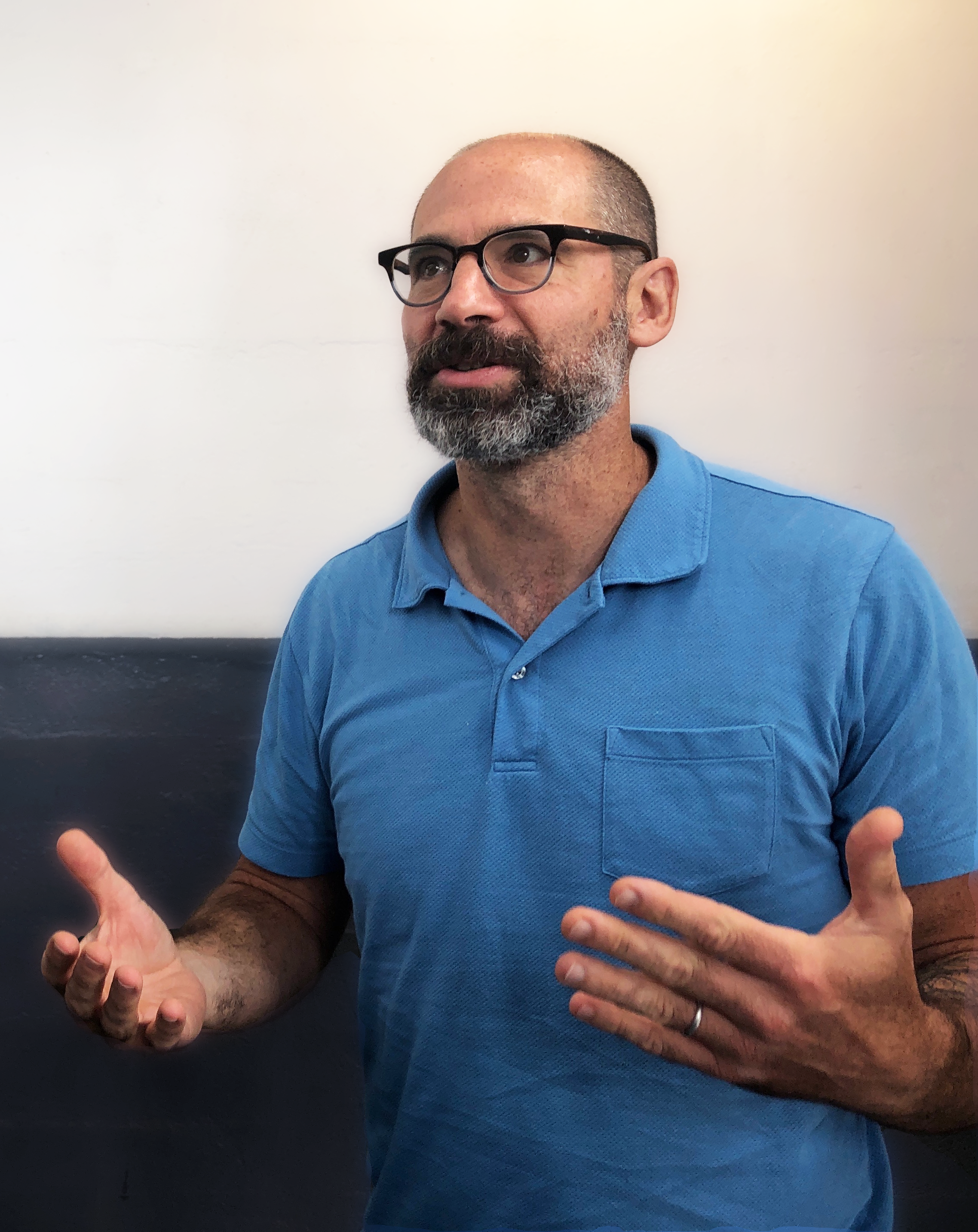
- Plotz in 2019
- Born: January 31, 1970 (age 56); London, England
- Education: Harvard University
- Occupation: Journalist
- Political party: Democratic
- Children: 3

David A. Plotz (born January 31, 1970) is an American journalist and former CEO of Atlas Obscura, an online magazine devoted to discovery and exploration. A writer with Slate since its inception in 1996, Plotz was the online magazine's editor from June 2008 until July 2014, succeeding Jacob Weisberg. Plotz is the founder and CEO of the local-news podcast network, City Cast.

== Early life and career ==
David Plotz was born in London and was raised in Washington, D.C., the child of Dr. Judith Plotz, an English professor at The George Washington University, and Dr. Paul H. Plotz, a researcher at the National Institutes of Health. He attended Lafayette Elementary School and the St. Albans School in Washington.

In 1992, Plotz graduated from Harvard University with an A.B. degree. While at Harvard, he wrote for The Harvard Crimson (1988—1992).

== Career ==
Plotz worked as a paralegal for the Department of Justice. He switched to journalism and served as a writer and senior editor for the Washington City Paper. He joined Slate when it launched in 1996.

== Work ==
Plotz has written for Slate, The New York Times Magazine, Harper's, Reader's Digest, Rolling Stone, New Republic, The Washington Post, Business Insider, and GQ. He won the National Press Club's Hume Award for Political Reporting in 2000, was a National Magazine Award finalist (for a Harper's article about South Carolina's gambling industry), and won an Online Journalism Award for a Slate piece on Enron. He appears on the weekly Slate Political Gabfest podcast with John Dickerson and Emily Bazelon.

He is the author of The Genius Factory: The Curious History of the Nobel Prize Sperm Bank (2005) about the Repository for Germinal Choice, and Good Book: The Bizarre, Hilarious, Disturbing, Marvelous, and Inspiring Things I Learned when I Read Every Single Word of the Bible (2009), based on his "Blogging the Bible" series from Slate.com.

== Personal life ==
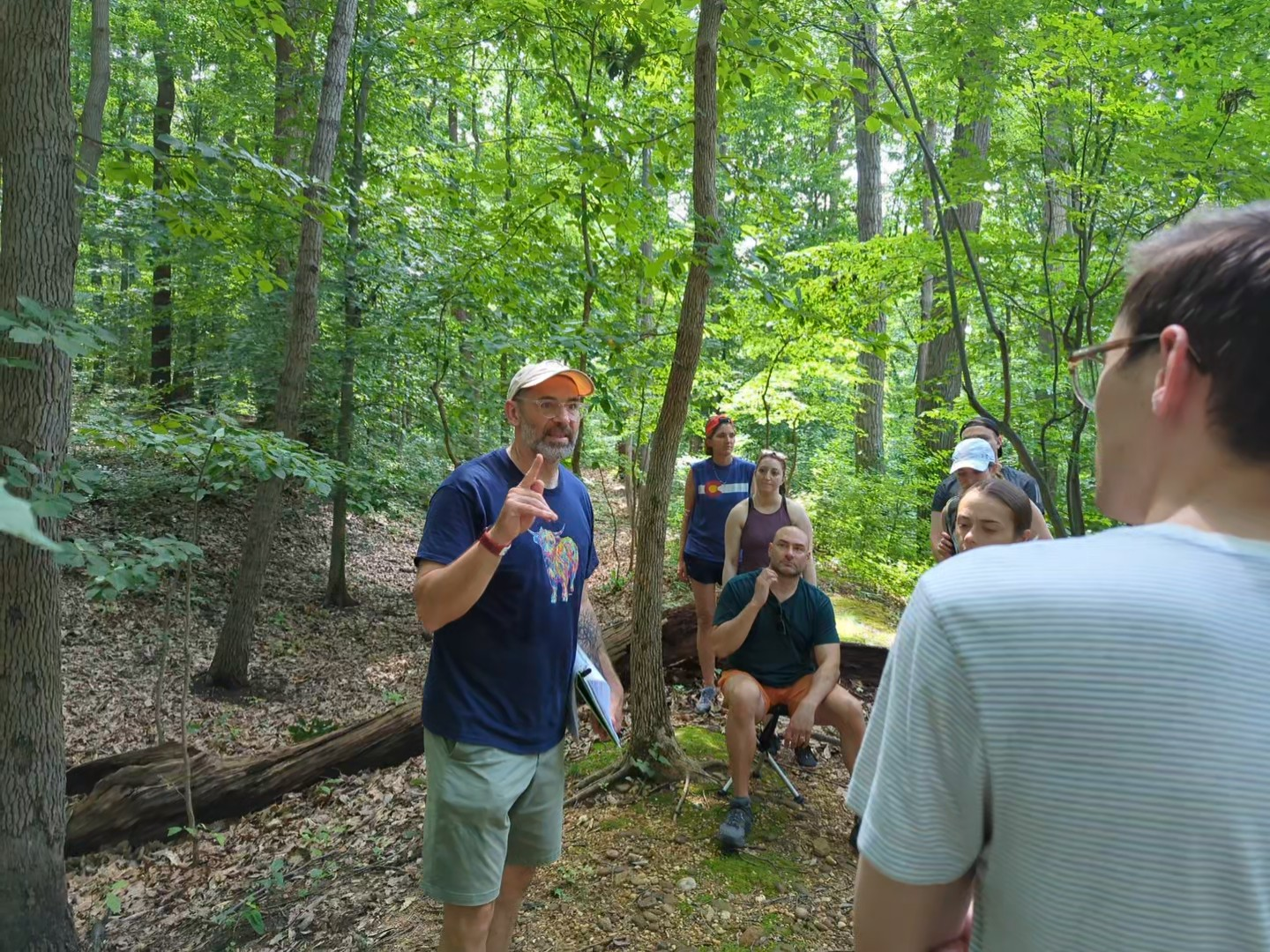
Plotz leads tours of Fort DeRussy.

Plotz was married to Hanna Rosin, a former reporter for The Washington Post and a national correspondent for The Atlantic. They lived in Washington, D.C., with their three children. They have since divorced. As of 2020, Plotz lives in Washington, DC, with his three children and two cats. Plotz is Jewish.

== Published works ==
- Plotz, David (2006). The Genius Factory: The Curious History of the Nobel Prize Sperm Bank. Random House Trade Paperbacks. ISBN 978-0812970524.
- Plotz, David (2010). Good Book: The Bizarre, Hilarious, Disturbing, Marvelous, and Inspiring Things I Learned When I Read Every Single Word of the Bible. Harper Perennial. ISBN 978-0061374258.
