= Earth Break =

Science fiction podcast by Skylark Media

- Genre: Science fiction podcast
- Country of origin: United States
- Language: English

Creative team
- Written by: Morgan Ormond
- Directed by: Aaron Katz

Cast and voices
- Starring: Jenny Slate

Production
- Production: April Lamb (producer)

Publication
- No. of seasons: 1
- No. of episodes: 9
- Original release: April 22 – July 9, 2019

Earth Break is a science fiction podcast produced by Skylark Media and starring Jenny Slate.

== Background ==
The show is a science fiction podcast produced by Skylark Media. Jenny Slate stars as Lynn Gellert, who is the only survivor of an alien invasion. Gellert is also pregnant. The podcast debuted at the 2019 Tribeca Festival.

== Reception ==
Jade Matias Bell wrote in The A.V. Club that Slate adds "charm and flow to a sometimes cliché script." Steve Greene praised Slate's acting in IndieWire saying that she pulled off "a magnetic central performance". Nick Douglas made a similar comment in LifeHacker saying that Slate's performance was the "best acting in an audio drama, some of the best acting in anything at all".
