= Michael Glick =

American dentist

Michael Glick is an American dentist, professor and researcher. He served as editor of the Journal of the American Dental Association (JADA) from 2005 until 2020 and as dean of the State University of New York at Buffalo School of Dental Medicine until August 14, 2015.

== Biography ==
Glick, whose father was a dentist, was born in Sweden and was trained in dentistry at the Hebrew University Hadassah School of Dental Medicine in Jerusalem, Israel and Temple University Dental School in Philadelphia, Pennsylvania. He completed graduate work in oral medicine at the University of Pennsylvania School of Dental Medicine. After finishing his training he founded one of the first dental clinics in the US dedicated to treating patients infected with HIV.

Before being appointed dean of SUNY Buffalo Dental School, Glick was professor of oral medicine and associate dean for oral and medical sciences at the A.T. Still University School of Osteopathic Medicine in Mesa, Arizona from January 1, 2007. Prior to that, he was professor and chair of oral diagnostic sciences at New Jersey Dental School and on the faculty at UPenn Dental in the department of oral medicine. Glick was a practicing dentist in Delaware and Pennsylvania for 15 years.

In December 2004, Glick was chosen as the editor of JADA, having been the associate editor for dentistry and medicine since 1998. He also served as president of the American Board of Oral Medicine. Glick has given more than eight hundred presentations in more than thirty countries.

In July 2021, Glick was named the executive director of the University of Pennsylvania's Center for Integrative Global Oral Health.

Glick is the editor of ten textbooks on dental management and oral medicine, and has published over three hundred articles on health-related topics.

His son is actor Gideon Glick.
