= Tumanbay (radio drama) =

Historical drama podcast from BBC Radio

- Genre: Fantasy; Historical period drama
- Language: English

Creative team
- Written by: John Dryden and Mike Walker
- Directed by: John Dryden

Cast and voices
- Voices: Rufus Wright; Olivia Popica; Matthew Marsh; Gareth Kennerley; Raad Rawi; Sarah Beck Mather; Nina Yndis; John Sessions; Laure Stockley; Akin Gazi; Darwin Brokenbro; Alexander Siddig

Music
- Theme music composed by: Sacha Puttnam

Production
- Production: Emma Hearn; Nadir Khan; John Dryden
- Length: 44:29 - 45:50

Technical specifications
- Audio format: MP3

Publication
- No. of seasons: 4
- No. of episodes: 34
- Original release: 2 December 2015 – 13 July 2020
- Provider: BBC Radio; Panoply Media

Related
- Website: www.bbc.co.uk/programmes/b06qcrhv

Tumanbay is a historical fantasy radio drama. The story is set in Tumanbay, the capital of a fictional empire, and involves political intrigue. Both a supernatural force and political unrest threaten the city. The setting is inspired by the Mamluk slave dynasty of Egypt.

== Broadcast ==
The first ten episodes of Tumanbay were first broadcast in the UK on BBC Radio 4 between December 2015 and February 2016. A second series, consisting of eight episodes, was broadcast between April and June 2017. In September 2017, in a deal between BBC and Panoply Media, the first two series were made available to international audiences on the Panoply network. Transmission of a third series of eight episodes, began on 4 February 2019 on BBC Radio 4. The first episode of the fourth series, was broadcast on BBC Radio 4 on 25 May 2020.

== Characters ==
- Gregor (Rufus Wright) is Head of the Palace Guard and one of Sultan Al-Ghuri's inner circle of advisors. His duties include espionage and counterespionage, and his methods are at once subtle and brutal. Gregor's childhood was spent as a slave in the far reaches of the Empire alongside his brother, Qulan, now Commander of the Imperial Army. The brothers were bought out of poverty by their master and trained in the arts of diplomacy and combat. At court, Gregor must contend with the rivalry of his nemesis, the Vizier Cadali, and with the vicissitudes of serving a cruel and fickle Sultan.
- Heaven (Olivia Popica) is 14. Her desire to see the world and take her place in it is tempered only by her reluctance to be married off in order to do so. As spring in Tumanbay is short-lived and soon gives way to the heat of summer, so must its children grow up fast. Heaven leaves behind the land of her childhood and sets sail with her mother Ila for Tumanbay, where the girl's father Ibn, a successful slave trader, is preparing her wedding. But fate, it seems, has other plans for Heaven, plans that will test her ability to survive and force her to become a woman.
- Cadali (Matthew Marsh) is the Vizier and the Sultan's chief advisor. Cadali's loyalties are to himself, to his Sultan and to Tumanbay, in that order. He possesses a finely-tuned sense of self-preservation coupled with a cunning and strategic mind. He trusts no one and demonstrates the ability to appear about the palace wherever he is least expected or wanted. Cadali also has an overwhelming fondness for sugar plums.
- Sultan Al-Ghuri (Raad Rawi) came to power following the untimely death of his brother, the previous Sultan. Having taken his brother's first wife Shajar as his own, he dotes on her son, his nephew Madu. Al-Ghuri's other foible is his love of perfume. Yet he wears the burden of office heavily, obsessively aware of the ever-present threat of assassination and of the fragility of the dynastic line.
- Shajar (Sarah Beck Mather) is Sultan Al-Ghuri's First Wife, and as such, head of the palace harem. Her son, Madu, is the only issue from her previous marriage to the former Sultan, Al-Ghuri's predecessor and brother. Shajar grew up in poverty and soon learnt to exploit her dazzling beauty in exchange for power and wealth. But Shajar understands that beauty is ephemeral and that she must fight to preserve her position and to safeguard her own future and that of her son.
- Sarah (Nina Yndis) was captured and brought to Tumanbay along with her baby as a slave. The beautiful Sarah arouses admiration and curiosity amongst all who encounter her. Her striking blue eyes and pale skin, along with her enigmatic and sophisticated bearing belie her status as a slave. She is appointed servant to Shajar, the First Wife, following the death of the previous maid.
- The Head Eunuch (John Sessions) is playful, yet ruthless. He has the plum position of deciding what is bought for the palace and what isn't. He recognises that the slave-girl, Sarah, is something different in Tumanbay.
- Shamsi (Laure Stockley) is a prostitute who serves the Palace. She beguiles men. Yet she is constantly afraid, fearful of her own fate.
- Like many sold into servitude in Tumanbay, the man known only as Slave (Akin Gazi) comes from noble origins in a country swallowed up by the empire in its hunger for land and resources. An involuntary companion of Heaven after he kidnaps her, he resents having to play bodyguard to a girl he sees as pampered and privileged.
- Boy (Darwin Brokenbro) is in the service of Rajik and Pamira in the moving town. The Boy has the ability to command dogs and other animals. He is fascinated by Heaven's beauty and driven by the desire for family.
- Wolf (Alexander Siddig) is the leader of a proudly independent band of warrior-horsemen from the austere mountains sworn to the service of Qulan. Wolf's appetite for love matches his lust for war.
- Daniel (Gareth Kennerley) an enslaved soldier. Daniel is a slave sold to the palace. The sultan decides to put Madu (Danny Ashok) into the army to help him "learn to be a man." He arrives thinking he's going to be an officer in charge of things; that it's going to be more of the privileged lifestyle, but instead he is handed down to the slave infantry soldiers to "toughen him up." It's a total shock to his system. He really struggles to survive. He is saved by Daniel, and their relationship becomes a strong bond of friendship and then eventually love.

== Episodes ==
=== Series 1 (2015-2016) ===
Season 1 premiered online in the United Kingdom on 2 December 2015.

No. in series	Title	Length (minutes:seconds)	Original release date
1	"A Head Start"	44:39	2 December 2015
Gregor (Rufus Wright) - Master of the Palace Guard - is charged by Sultan Al-Ghuri (Raad Rawi) with the task of rooting out an insurgence and crushing it.
2	"Ship of the Dead"	44:39	9 December 2015
Another threat is making its way by sea. As slave merchant Ibn (Nabil Elouahabi) awaits for his family to arrive in Tumanbay, sickness has broken out on the ship carrying them.
3	"Coming of Age"	44:48	16 December 2015
Fourteen year old daughter (Olivia Popica) of slave merchant Ibn (Nabil Elouahabi) is adrift at sea in a small boat and captive to an escaped slave (Akin Gazi). Now she must depend on her slave captor for her survival. Madu (Danny Ashok), the spoilt nephew of the Sultan, also has to grow up quickly as he swaps palace life for hard graft in the army.
4	"Hidden Knowledge"	44:33	23 December 2015
Shajar, the Sultan's chief wife (Sarah Beck Mather), plots her son Madu's (Danny Ashok) succession to the throne. While Gregor, Master of the Palace Guard, is determined to discover what it is she has taken from the aged Hafiz and is having repaired in the workshop of a pair of artisans in the city. Marching with the army out to the provinces, Madu's slave find solace with an unlikely companion.
5	"Strangle Hold"	44:36	30 December 2015
General Qulan (Christopher Fulford) finds the Provincial Governors less than enthusiastic as he arrives to gather the armies to fight rebel "queen" Maya. In Tumanbay, Gregor is under pressure to find the spies but his investigations keep leading him back to Shajar the Sultan's chief wife (Sarah Beck Mather) and a reliquary she has secreted away.
6	"In the Beginning"	44:33	6 January 2016
Tumanbay is in chaos after the murder of a highly placed individual. Heaven and her slave companion find themselves prisoners of a nomadic tribe in the desert. Having failed in his duty of keeping the Palace safe, Gregor attempts to unlock the secret of the missing reliquary and find out why it is worth killing for.
7	"A Tale of Two Cities"	44:45	13 January 2016
Sultan Al-Ghuri (Raad Rawi) dreams of victory against rebellious provincial leader Maya. Meanwhile Gregor (Rufus Wright) is in pursuit of missing slave-girl Sarah (Nina Yndis) and must venture into the catacombs beneath the city, haven to those who wish to escape the brutality of the City above.
8	"The Purge"	44:36	20 January 2016
Sultan (Raad Rawi) is increasingly insecure and fearful for his life, so begins a purge of the Palace. Slave trader Ibn (Nabil Elouahabi), is reunited with the daughter he thought he had lost. And her slave companion finally comes face to face with Gregor (Rufus Wright), the man who stole his kingdom.
9	"Jaws of Victory"	44:33	27 January 2016
A trade delegation from across the ocean, brings to Tumanbay the very latest in war merchandise. Convinced of victory by the words of the prophet child, the Sultan (Raad Rawi) is now ready to march out with his armies and destroy rebellious provincial leader Maya. His nephew Madu (Danny Ashok) has only one desire - to escape the city with his army comrade and lover Daniel (Gareth Kennerley). But Daniel is not everything he seems.
10	"Sword of Faith"	44:29	3 February 2016
As the people of Tumanbay await news of the Sultan's (Raad Rawi) great victory, Gregor (Rufus Wright) the heartless player discovers he has a heart and that he has been played.

=== Series 2 (2017) ===
Season 2 premiered online in the United Kingdom on 25 April 2017.

No. in series	Title	Length (minutes:seconds)	Original release date
1	"The Last Boat"	45:10	25 April 2017
Tumanbay, the wealthiest city on earth, has been conquered by a brutal religious regime, the followers of Maya. Responsible for rooting out heretics is Barakat (Hiran Abeysekera), a ruthless and uncompromising zealot. As refugees scramble to escape the city, Gregor (Rufus Wright), previously Master of the Palace Guard, has sworn an oath to the new rulers and struggles to survive as the new regime sets about dismantling the city of everything of value.
2	"The Kill"	43:43	2 May 2017
Under the brutal rule of the puritanical followers of Maya, Tumanbay, once the most powerful and wealthy city on earth, has become a place of fear and suspicion. While Gregor attempts to survive the regime by collaborating and demonstrating his loyalty, his niece Manel (Aiysha Hart) is drawn to the rebel cause. Both are playing a deadly game.
3	"Rats"	45:50	9 May 2017
While betrayals and counter-betrayals dominate Gregor's every waking moment, and the young puppet Sultan, Madu, becomes increasingly reckless in his quest to satisfy his cravings, Gregor's niece Manel is sent by her rebel comrades into the desert on a mission to kill. What she discovers there is a threat even deadlier than Tumanbay's brutal new rulers.
4	"Healing the Sick"	45:00	16 May 2017
As slave trader Ibn (Nabil Elouahabi), accused of hoarding heretical text, seeks justice from the new regime's religious courts, news arrives of a devastating plague in the swamps outside the city. Undeterred, the all-powerful Inquisitor, Barakat (Hiran Abeysekera), continues his mission to cleanse the city of heretics and he chooses Gregor (Rufus Wright) to assist.
5	"Kiss My Fingers"	43:45	23 May 2017
Threat of plague from outlying villages and how to deal with it brings the Inquisitor Barakat (Hiran Abeysekera) into conflict with the ailing regent Effendi Red (Sagar Arya). Meanwhile, Manel (Aiysha Hart) - having failed in the task given to her by the rebels - must now prove her commitment to the cause by undertaking a more dangerous mission. One that brings her face to face with a deadly secret at the heart of this fanatical regime.
6	"Holy Father"	43:43	30 May 2017
Following a series of murders, the Inquisitor Barakat's (Hiran Abeysekera) hold over Tumanbay is complete. Rebel fighter Manel (Aiysha Hart) seeks refuge with co-conspirator Doctor Dorin (Vincent Ebrahim). But can Dorin be trusted and what is "the great project" he is working on with Barakat?
7	"Take My Hand"	43:53	6 June 2017
Manel (Aiysha Hart) and Heaven (Tanya Ravljen) have escaped the city and go to the swamps in search of Manel's enslaved father, General Qulan (Christopher Fulford). Back in Tumanbay, there's someone new in charge and the puppet Sultan Madu (Danny Ashok) has a secret rendezvous with his old love, Daniel (Gareth Kennerley).
8	"We Are Three"	43:43	13 June 2017
The blood-soaked finale to the second series. The rebel army, under General Qulan (Christopher Fulford) prepares to march on the city where Gregor (Rufus Wright) struggles to decide where his loyalties lie and is faced with a terrible truth about his past.

=== Series 3 (2019) ===
Season 3 premiered online in the United Kingdom on 4 February 2019.

No. in series	Title	Length (minutes:seconds)	Original release date
1	"Tree of Sorrows"	51:29	4 February 2019
Tumanbay is recovering from a brutal occupation by the followers of Maya. Manel, daughter of the Empire's greatest general, now sits on the throne. Her chief advisor and lover is the mysterious traveler Alkin. The city has been plundered of much of its wealth, and desperate for allies, a marriage has been arranged between Manel and Herod, the feckless son of a powerful provincial governor. Gregor, Manel's uncle and Master of the elite Palace Guard, is convinced that Maya and her followers are still a threat to the Empire.
2	"Two Moons"	49:06	11 February 2019
As Tumanbay prepares for a royal wedding, the return of a certain prominent palace official offers hope of new alliances. Whilst the kite flyers of Tumanbay risk their lives for new adventure, Heaven—whose father was executed during the occupation—attempts to rebuild the family slave business and goes on a voyage to distance shores to purchase slaves, accompanied by one of her father's business associates, the self-serving Bavand.
3	"The Blind Man"	49:14	18 February 2019
Weakened by occupation, an offer of friendship and protection comes from the Balarac, a formidable group of priest warriors, led by the blind Grand Master Amalric. But protection comes at a price the city can ill-afford. Whilst General Qulan leaves to build an army, in the palace Gregor finds himself in a desperate struggle for power and influence.
4	"Dark Enterprises"	49:12	25 February 2019
Treachery lurks in the shadows in the form of Cadali, the recently returned vizier. Meanwhile, the prophet boy Frog is a stowaway on a Balarc ship. His mission: to kill their leader, the blind Grand Master, who he believes is destined to harm the girl he loves.
5	"Accidental Hero"	49:27	4 March 2019
General Qulan travels to the provinces to raise an army and encounters Fatima, a provincial governor's wife with a score to settle. In Tumanbay, a coup is underway and Prince Herod has a chance to act to save his wife, the Sultana Manel. Meanwhile, slave merchant Heaven, having been captured by the Balarac at sea, is recruited as assistant and reader to the blind Grand Master, a position that gives her access to ancient scrolls that appear to unlock profound secrets to the world.
6	"Fatima"	49:21	11 March 2019
The return of General Qulan with an army from the provinces offers hope of stability to the city recovering from a recent coup. But with them has come Herod's ambitious mother Fatima, a new player in the fight for power. Meanwhile, the slave merchant Bavand has found his way back to Tumanbay. With debts to pay, he turns to his one remaining "asset", his daughter Matilla.
7	"Hostage of Fortune"	49:15	18 March 2019
After his failed bid for power, Cadali flees across the desert with his son Selim, while Fatima, set on revenge for her murdered son, sends Gregor to bring him back. Meanwhile, Frog returns to the city and to Matilla, the girl he loves, believing he has changed her fate.
8	"The Coming"	49:31	25 March 2019
Matilla, having murdered her abusive husband, returns with Frog to her family home to try to rescue her brother and flee the city. Meanwhile, Cadali, now a captive of the priest-like Balarac, is brought back to Tumanbay in chains and offered as a gift to Fatima. As the city welcomes the Balarac in, a new uncomfortable alliance seems to be forming. Or is it a deadly game of deception?

=== Series 4 (2020) ===
Season 4 premiered online in the United Kingdom on 25 May 2020.

No. in series	Title	Length (minutes:seconds)	Original release date
1	"Palace of the Blind"	43:45	25 May 2020
2	"Glass Souls"	43:48	1 June 2020
3	"Pronounced 'A Killer'"	43:48	8 June 2020
4	"Feels Like Old Times"	43:39	15 June 2020
5	"The Watchers"	43:33	22 June 2020
6	"Secret Garden"	43:45	29 June 2020
7	"Menagerie of All Life"	43:48	6 July 2020
8	"The Fires"	56:44	13 July 2020

== Reception ==
The first season of the podcast was well received. June Thomas in Slate called it the "Best podcast of the year". Because of its medieval setting, large cast of characters, and themes of political intrigue, the podcast was often compared with the HBO TV series, Game of Thrones.
