= Megaphone (podcasting) =

Podcast technology company

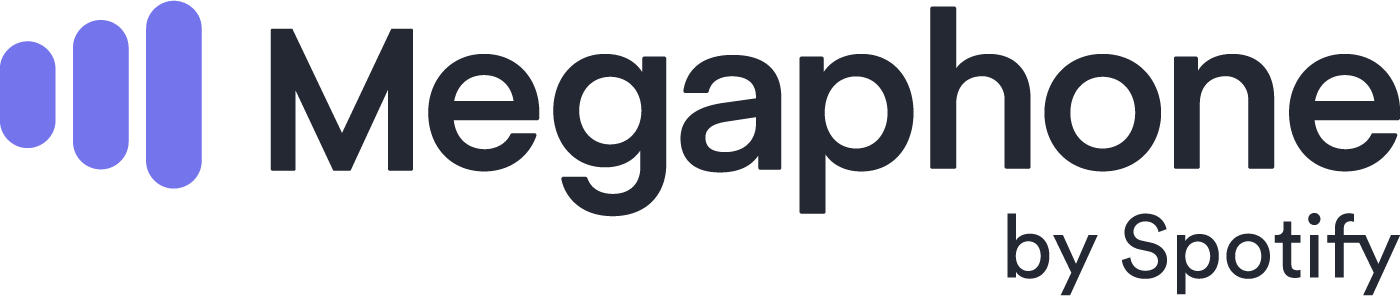
- Industry: Radio
- Genre: Podcasts
- Founded: February 2015
- Founders: Andy Bowers, Brendan Monaghan
- Headquarters: Reston, Virginia, U.S.
- Key people: Brendan Monaghan (CEO); Andy Bowers (CCO); Matt Turck (CRO); Jason Cox (CTO)
- Number of employees: 25 (2016)
- Parent: Spotify Technology S.A. (2020-present)
- Website: megaphone.fm

Megaphone (formerly Panoply Media) is a software-as-a-service (SaaS) business owned by Spotify. The company provides software for podcast hosting and monetization as well as an ad network to generate additional revenue for podcast publishers. It was formerly an audio content producer started by The Slate Group as Panoply Media, and later shifted to focusing solely on software for monetizing, measuring and distributing podcasts of media companies and independent producers.

Former logo

== History ==
Slate began podcasting in 2005 with the Slate Political Gabfest. Panoply Media launched in Feb 2015 led by Andy Bowers, Brendan Monaghan and Matt Turck within The Slate Group. Panoply acquired dynamic ad-insertion company Audiometric in August 2015, adding key technology leader and eventual CTO, Jason Cox, in the process. Panoply made the Audiometric technology available to other companies in January 2016 under the moniker "Megaphone".

As of February 2017, Panoply had published more than 100 podcasts through partnerships with Sports Illustrated, The Huffington Post, New York magazine, Time, Inc., Vox, Real Simple, The Wall Street Journal, and Politico. It has produced branded content for Purina, Umpqua Bank, Prudential and Starbucks. Panoply launched Pinna, an audio subscription platform for families in 2017.

In January 2018, the Slate Group separated its Slate-branded podcasts, such as The Gist, from the rest of the Panoply lineup, for purposes of revenue control as it sought to increase membership in Slate Plus, its premium content service. Accordingly, Slate podcasts no longer carry the Panoply logo and branding.

In September 2018, it was announced that Panoply would cease production of all podcasts and shut down its editorial division in order to focus on podcast hosting, analytics, and monetization technology as well as its ad marketplace known as the Megaphone Targeted Marketplace. Shortly thereafter, Pinna was spun out as a separate company owned by Panoply parent Graham Holdings in early 2019.

In November 2020, Spotify announced its intent to acquire Megaphone from Graham Holdings for US$235 million. The acquisition was completed in December 2020. After the acquisitions of podcast technology companies Whooshkaa in December 2021 and Chartable in February 2022, Spotify announced that these products will be integrated into Megaphone. Realm Media acquired Pinna from Graham Holdings in 2023.

== Former Panoply branded podcasts ==
BuzzFeed

- Internet Explorer
- No One Knows Anything
- See Something Say Something — about being Muslim in America
- Another Round — topics ranging from race, gender and pop culture to squirrels, mangoes, and jokes, hosted by Tracy Clayton and Heben Nigatu

First Look Media

- Intercepted with Jeremy Scahill — by The Intercept
- Maeve in America — hosted by Maeve Higgins

GE Podcast Theater

- The Message — science fiction, co-produced with Slate
- Life.After

MTV

- Game of Crones — recap of Game of Thrones
- Happy Sad Confused — celebrities
- Lady Problems — women's issues
- North Mollywood
- Skillset
- Speed Dial
- Team Wolf
- The Stakes

Politico

- Nerdcast — politics
- Off Message

Popular Mechanics

- How Your World Works
- Most Useful Podcast Ever

Vanity Fair

- In the Limelight
- Little Gold Men — the Oscar race

Vox

- The Ezra Klein Show
- The Weeds — hosted by Ezra Klein, Sarah Kliff, and Matthew Yglesias

Wall Street Journal

- Heard On the Street
- Media Mix
- Money, Markets & More
- MoneyBeat
- Opinion: Foreign Edition
- Opinion: Potomac Watch
- Tech News Briefing
- Watching Your Wealth
- What's News
- Your Money Matters

Other

- BackStory — a weekly podcast about American history, hosted by Ed Ayers, Brian Balogh, Nathan Connolly and Joanne Freeman
- Bad With Money — hosted by Gabe Dunn
- Girlboss Radio with Sophia Amoruso
- GLoP Culture — with Jonah Goldberg, John Podhoretz, and Rob Long
- Revisionist History — hosted by Malcolm Gladwell
- T. D. Jakes Podcast
- Detective — weekly interviews with Detectives who are being featured on Investigation Discovery true crime shows.
- Tumanbay — international broadcast of this BBC Four scripted radio drama, set in a fictional Middle Eastern city during the Middle Ages. Two seasons have already aired in the UK.
- Whatever Happened To Pizza At McDonald's? — investigative journalism program centered around the circumstances and reasoning for fast food chain McDonald's ceasing to offer pizza in their restaurants.
- LGBTQ&A — interview podcast documenting the stories of the LGBTQ community with Jeffrey Masters.
- By the Book — bi-weekly podcast trying out self-help books with Jolenta Greenberg and Kristen Meinzer.
- You Must Remember This — early Hollywood history with Karina Longworth.

== Slate branded podcasts ==
- Amicus — Amicus is a podcast about "the Supreme Court and the laws it interprets for the United States," hosted by Dahlia Lithwick. The podcast first aired October 23, 2014 and has aired a few times a month since
- Audio Book Club — The Audio Book Club functions as a book discussion club. Every month critics gather to discuss a book previously announced. The podcast first aired on March 15, 2006
- Culture Gabfest — a weekly round-table focusing on cultural news, with Stephen Metcalf, Dana Stevens, and Julia Turner. The podcast first aired on April 23, 2008, and airs every Wednesday.
- Daily Podcast — All of Slate's podcasts and extra content.
- Dear Prudence — Dear Prudence is an advice column, hosted by Daniel Mallory Ortberg. The column dates back to 1997, and the podcast to June 7, 2016. The podcast airs every Wednesday
- The Waves — women's issues, formerly The Double X Gabfest
- The Gist — The Gist is a daily (Monday through Friday) news and opinion podcast hosted by Mike Pesca
- Upon Further Review — Upon Further Review is a limited release podcast hosted by Mike Pesca, focusing on sports hypotheticals, such as, "What would have happened if the Brooklyn Dodgers had never left for Los Angeles?"
- Hang Up and Listen — sports
- Hit Parade — music history and the Billboard Hot 100, hosted by Chris Molanphy.
- Lexicon Valley — language issues
- Slate Money — business and finance, hosted by Felix Salmon
- Mom and Dad Are Fighting — parenting
- Slate Political Gabfest — a weekly round-table focusing on political news
- Trumpcast — originally focused on Trump's presidential run, it continued to cover his presidency
- Whistlestop — politics, hosted by John Dickerson
- Slate Presents — an anthology series, where each season functions as a stand-alone narrative miniseries. The first season, titled Standoff: What Happened at Ruby Ridge? was hosted by Ruth Graham, and examined the Ruby Ridge incident. The second season, hosted by Emily Bazelon, is titled Charged: A True Punishment Story and examines the workings of a special court in New York that focused on cases of illegal gun possession.

Slate's imprint, the Onward Project

- Happier with Gretchen Rubin
- Radical Candor — managers and relationships at work
- Side Hustle School — about making money on the side while having a main job, hosted by Chris Guillebeau

== Previous shows ==
Slate

- Spoiler Specials — film
- About Race
- Manners for the Digital Age

Other

- Politically Re-Active — political comedy, hosted by W. Kamau Bell and Hari Kondabolu, moved to Earwolf after Season 1.

== See also ==
- List of podcasting companies
