= Case 63 =

Scifi thriller podcast

- Genre: Science fiction
- Format: Radio drama
- Language: English
- Version also in: Spanish, Portuguese, Hindi

Creative team
- Created by: Julio Rojas
- Written by: Julio Rojas
- Directed by: Mimi O'Donnell
- Adapted by: Mara Vélez Meléndez

Cast and voices
- Starring: Julianne Moore and Oscar Isaac

Music
- Composed by: Mowat

Production
- Length: average 12 minutes

Publication
- No. of seasons: 2
- No. of episodes: 10 per season
- Original release: October 25, 2022
- Provider: Gimlet Media and Spotify

Related
- Related shows: Caso 63 (Chilean original); Paciente 63 (Brazilian adaption); Virus 2062 (Indian adaption)

Case 63 is a science fiction podcast produced by Gimlet Media and FortySix with Julianne Moore and Oscar Isaac starring as the protagonists. It is a remake of a Chilean podcast, Caso 63. The first season was released on October 25, 2022, and the second on September 26, 2023.

== Background ==
The podcast is an English-language adaptation of the Spanish-language podcast Caso 63, which has also been adapted into Portuguese and Hindi. The original was created and written by Julio Rojas, and produced in Santiago, Chile by Emisor Podcasting. It was Spotify's most-listened-to show in Latin America. The show is the first Gimlet Media production to be adapted into multiple languages.

The show is a science fiction podcast that follows the therapy sessions of Peter Roiter who claims to be a time traveler.

== Production ==
The recording of the show only took a few days. The podcast was produced by Gimlet Media and FortySix, which had previously worked with Oscar Isaac on Homecoming. The show is a Spotify exclusive show.

The season 1 was released on October 25, 2022. Season 2's trailer was released on September 19, 2023, and the season itself on September 26.

== Cast and characters ==
- Male lead (Oscar Isaac)
  - Peter Roiter – a 39-year-old man from Essex who claims to be a time traveler from 2062, born in 2023.
  - Dr. Vincent Caldwell – a New York psychiatrist, a 39-year-old widower with a teenage daughter.
- Dr. Eliza Beatrix Knight (Julianne Moore) – a 38-year-old New York psychiatrist in 2022 treating Peter.
- Oliver Collins (Arian Moayed) – a sci-fi writer and conspiracy theorist
- Marie Baker (Zoë Winters) – patient zero for the Pegasus virus.

== Episodes ==
Season	Episodes	Originally released
1	10	October 25, 2022
2	10	September 26, 2023

=== Season 1 ===
No. overall	No. in season	Title	Runtime	Original release date
1	1	"The Story I Grew Up With"	9:04	October 25, 2022
First session, October 22nd 2022: Dr Knight begins therapy with her new patient, a man known as Case 63. He claims he's a time-traveler from 2062.
2	2	"DeLorean"	12:27	October 25, 2022
Session two, October 23rd 2022: Peter explains he grew up amid ongoing waves of COVID-19, as the world slowly crumbled, and that he's here because he needs to save the world.
3	3	"Pegasus"	11:59	October 25, 2022
Session three, October 24th 2022: Peter tells Dr Knight about Pegasus, a deadly COVID variant that ravages the world in the future. Patient zero will be a woman named Marie Baker who begins to spread the virus on Flight 262 from New York to London on November 24th, 2022.
4	4	"Garnier Malet Effect"	9:47	October 25, 2022
Session four, October 25th 2022: Peter tells Dr Knight she is part of his plan to save the world.
5	5	"Alphabet Soup"	7:43	October 25, 2022
Session five, October 26th 2022.
6	6	"History Exam"	11:44	October 25, 2022
Session six, October 27th 2022: Dr Knight brings in examiner Dr Julian Silva (Kelly AuCoin) to administer a polygraph test to Peter.
7	7	"Jemmy Button"	10:19	October 25, 2022
Session seven, October 28th 2022: Dr. Knight brings in her physicist friend Dr Devash Patel (Dariush Kashani) to scrutinize the physics of Peter's time travel claims. Peter antagonizes him until he leaves. Dr Knight decides to drop Peter as a patient because she cannot be professional with him. She gets a phone call from her mother (uncredited), urging her to reach out to her sister.
8	8	"Gaspar Marin"	8:45	October 25, 2022
Session eight, October 29th 2022: Dr Knight meets with chief of psychiatry Dr Alex Rizzolatti (Pooya Mohseni). Peter confesses to being fraud, and says he's a science fiction writer named Oliver Collins, associated with the internet forum SCP Foundation, and that he claimed to be a time traveler as part of an experiment suggested on the forum.
9	9	"Entanglement"	13:08	October 25, 2022
October 31st 2022: Dr Knight makes a recording to document her thoughts. She found and called Oliver Collins, who is a real amateur science fiction writer, but is not her patient. Peter gives Dr Knight a recording explaining everything.
10	10	"Patient Zero"	16:52	October 25, 2022
November 24th 2022: Under Peter's instructions, Dr Knight goes to JFK Airport to meet Marie Baker (Zoë Winters). December 17th 2022: FBI Special Agent Ian Swift (Alfredo Narciso) makes a recording about the missing person case he's working on: the disappearance of Eliza Beatrix Knight.

=== Season 2 ===
No. overall	No. in season	Title	Runtime	Original release date
11	1	"The Lost Vortex"	13:35	September 26, 2023
12	2	"Life Imitates Movies"	13:12	September 26, 2023
13	3	"Forget Everything You Believe"	11:11	September 26, 2023
14	4	"It's Been a Long Time, Beatrix"	12:53	September 26, 2023
15	5	"The Good Doctor"	13:05	September 26, 2023
16	6	"What Is The Future Like?"	11:31	September 26, 2023
17	7	"What Would You Do For Love?"	12:27	September 26, 2023
18	8	"An Angel, Destroyer of Worlds"	14:33	September 26, 2023
19	9	"Replacement Flight"	16:11	September 26, 2023
20	10	"The Big Picture"	9:50	September 26, 2023

== Reception ==
The show was near the top of Spotify's charts during the month following its release.
