= Bristol Central High School =

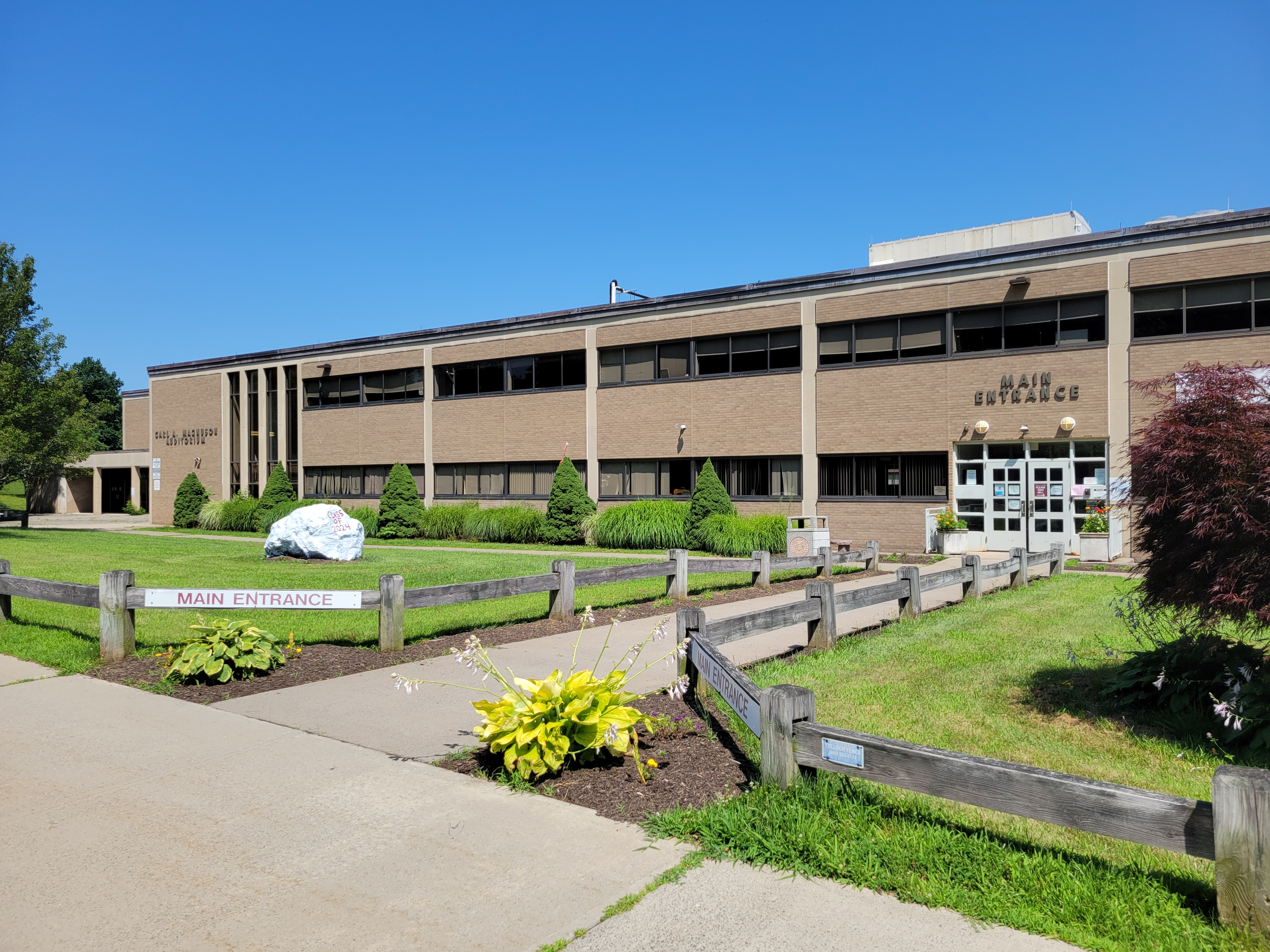

Location
- 480 Wolcott Street; Bristol, Connecticut 06010; United States
- 41°39′41″N 72°57′37″W

Information
- Type: Public high school
- Motto: "Be Creative, Be Conscientious, Be Collaborative, Be Committed."
- Established: 1959 (67 years ago)
- School district: Bristol Public Schools
- Superintendent: Sue Moreau
- CEEB code: 070075
- Principal: Brandon HuBrins
- Teaching staff: 81.92 (on an FTE basis)
- Grades: 9-12
- Enrollment: 1,148 (2024–2025)
- Student to teacher ratio: 14.01
- Colors: Maroon and white
- Fight song: "March On For Central High"
- Athletics conference: Central Connecticut Conference Southern Division
- Team name: Rams
- Website: bchs.bristol.k12.ct.us

Bristol Central High School is a public high school in Bristol, Connecticut, United States. Its mascot is the Ram, and its colors are maroon and white. The school is known for its performing arts group, Central Stage, as well as for its athletics. The Rams have excelled in basketball, baseball, wrestling, and track in recent years. In 2017, then-principal Peter Wininger was awarded Varsity Brands 'Principal of Principles,' deeming him the best principal in the United States. The school's Italian Language teacher Gina Gallo-Reinhardt nominated Wininger for the award, and he and his family were sent to Florida for the ceremony where he was crowned the winner.

== Athletics ==
Bristol Central has won state championships in:

- Boys basketball: 1990, 2022
- Wrestling: 1985, 1998
- Softball: 1985
- Boys cross country: 2010

== Notable alumni ==
- Donovan Clingan, 2022: basketball player
- Jocelin Donahue, 1999: actress, most famous for her role in the 2009 horror film The House of the Devil
- Michelle Guerette, 1998: Olympic rower
- Aaron Hernandez, 2007: former NFL tight end and convicted murderer. Was posthumously diagnosed with chronic traumatic encephalopathy (CTE)
- Scott Perkins, 1998: composer
- Adrian Wojnarowski, 1987: sports columnist who has covered the NBA for Yahoo! Sports and ESPN
