= Scott Perkins =

Composer, scholar, educator

- Born: June 25, 1980 (age 46)
- Occupation: Composer

Justin Scott Perkins (born June 25, 1980) is an international prize-winning composer of vocal music, an award-winning scholar, and a professor at California State University, Sacramento.

Until 2020, Perkins wrote a balance of sacred and secular music. Notable works include A Word Out of The Sea (2003, winner of a BMI Student Composer Award), The Stolen Child (2006), Charon (2012; libretto by Nat Cassidy; commissioned by the Kennedy Center and Washington National Opera), and A New England Requiem (2016).

Since 2020, Perkins's music has been mostly extended, secular, choral works that support and illuminate the words of contemporary authors on themes of social justice, environmentalism, and mental health. His style can be characterized by its lyricism, modal influences, tonal centricity, and metric flexibility. Benjamin Britten, Thomas Tallis, Sigur Rós, Arvo Pärt, and Samuel Barber have influenced the techniques and sound of some of his music. Notable works include Alive Poems (2020) and A Map to the Next World (2023).

== Early life and education ==
Perkins grew up in Bristol, Connecticut. He began composing at the age of five, studied composition at The Hartt School Community Division at age twelve, and won his first competition at 14, resulting in a premiere by the Hartford Symphony Orchestra. He graduated from Bristol Central High School in 1998.

Perkins studied music theory and composition with Martin Amlin, Richard Cornell, Charles Fussell, and Marjorie Merryman at the Boston University College of Fine Arts. He minored in vocal performance; his voice teachers were William Hite and Joy McIntyre. He won several departmental awards and prizes, and he graduated with highest honors in 2002. He pursued graduate studies at the Eastman School of Music, earning master's degrees in Music Theory Pedagogy and Music Theory, and a PhD in Composition. His composition teachers were Ricardo Zohn-Muldoon and Carlos Sanchez-Gutierrez.

== Career ==
Perkins's career has comprised composing, teaching, research, and concertizing as a tenor.

In 2011, he scored Sir Peter Shaffer’s play, ‘’The Gift of the Gorgon’’ in collaboration with the playwright. The play was performed at Guild Hall in East Hampton, New York, starring Alec Baldwin and directed by Tony Walton.

In 2017, Perkins joined the faculty of California State University, Sacramento, where he is Head of Music Theory and Musicianship. Previously, he served on the faculties of Nazareth College, Central Connecticut State University, the Interlochen Arts Camp (as Instructor of Choral Studies), and DePauw University.

Perkins has presented on: the integration of Western and non-Western music in musicianship curricula at conferences of the College Music Society and the Society of Arts Entrepreneurship Educators; teaching music-reading skills to amateur choirs at a convention of the American Guild of Organists at Yale University; and 17th-century lute song performance practice at the University of Chicago. He gave the keynote address and a paper on the history and reception of Olivier Messiaen’s work in the United States as part of the celebrations for the 75th anniversary of the premiere of the Quartet for the End of Time in Zgorzelec, Poland. His work on the music of Benjamin Britten was awarded a prize by the New York State-St. Lawrence Chapter of the American Musicological Society. He has been an invited guest lecturer on his music and research at Harvard University, The Hartt School, Boston University, and the University of the Pacific.

Perkins has concertized as a tenor specializing in early and modern Western classical music throughout the United States, England, Mexico, Scotland, and Norway. He has performed with numerous professional ensembles as both a vocalist and a conductor, and he is a featured soloist on CDs produced by Bridge Records and Loft Recordings.
