= Forest 404 =

BBC sci-fi podcast starring Pearl Mackie

- The official cover art for Forest 404.
- Genre: Science fiction podcast
- Country of origin: United Kingdom
- Language: British English

Creative team
- Created by: BBC Radio 4; BBC Natural History Unit; Open University; University of Bristol; University of Exeter
- Written by: Timothy X Atack
- Directed by: Becky Ripley

Cast and voices
- Starring: Pearl Mackie
- Voices: Pearl Mackie; Tanya Moodie; Pippa Haywood

Music
- Theme music composed by: Bonobo

Production
- Production: Becky Ripley; Eliza Lomas; Graham Wild
- Length: 10–20 minutes

Publication
- No. of seasons: 1
- No. of episodes: 27
- Original release: 5 March – 1 April 2019
- Provider: BBC Radio 4

Reception
- Ratings: 4.2727272727272725/5, 4.7/5
- Cited for: 2020 WGGB award; 2020 ARIAS award

Related
- Website: www.bbc.co.uk/forest

Forest 404 was a science fiction podcast produced by the BBC that starred Pearl Mackie. The series debuted in 2019 on BBC Sounds and was later broadcast on BBC Radio 4. The 27-part show was composed of nine narrative episodes, each accompanied by a soundscape and a discussion on the show's themes. The story was written by Timothy X Atak, and the theme music was by Bonobo.

The narrative of the show follows a data analyst named Pan who lives in a dystopian 24th century. Pan is tasked with cataloguing and deleting the remaining audio from before a global catastrophe. While reviewing the audio, she discovers recordings of the natural world and finds that they have a profound effect on whoever listens to them. The show received largely positive reviews and, in 2020, won both a WGGB award and an ARIAS award.

The podcast was accompanied by an academic study led by Alex Smalley with funding from the Arts and Humanities Research Council. The study focused on the psychological effects of listening to sounds from nature. The project was a collaboration among The Virtual Nature Project, BBC Radio 4, the BBC Natural History Unit, the University of Bristol, the University of Exeter, and the Open University.

== Production ==
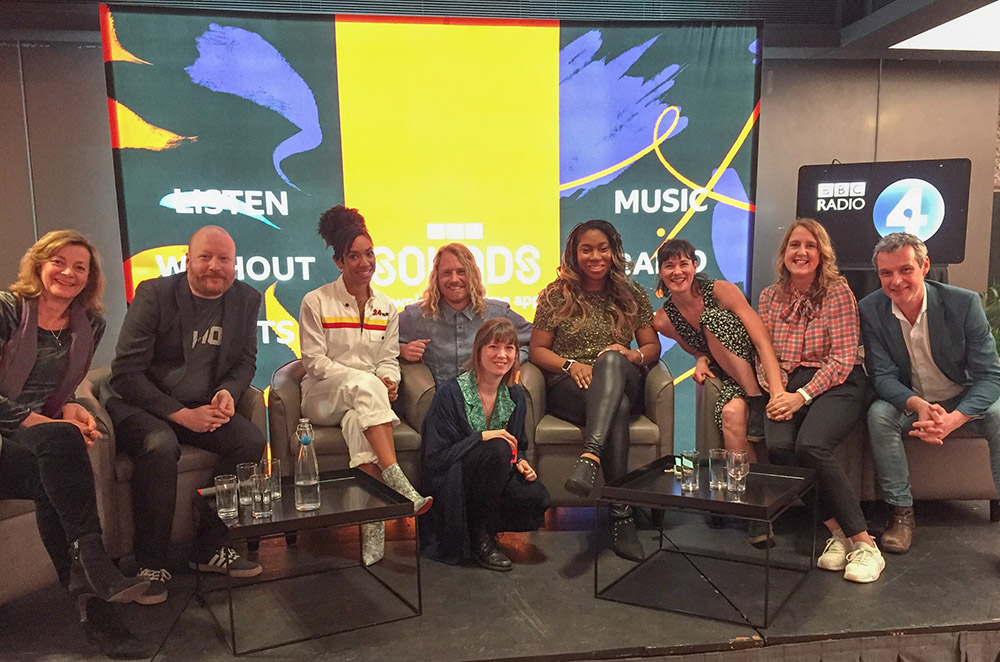
Forest 404 launch event at the Barbican Conservatory. Left to Right: Pippa Haywood, Timothy X Atack, Pearl Mackie, Alex Smalley, Eliza Lomas, Tanya Moodie, Becky Ripley, Rhian Roberts, Graham Wild.

The show is an environmental thriller and dystopian science fiction podcast commissioned by Rhian Roberts and written by Timothy X Atack. The show was produced by Becky Ripley and Eliza Lomas with sound design by Graham Wild and theme music by Bonobo. The 27-part series is composed of nine narrative episodes, each accompanied by a soundscape and a discussion on the themes. The soundscapes are approximately five minutes in length and utilise binaural recording to immerse the listener in the sounds of the natural world similar to forest bathing. The show was first released as a podcast on BBC Sounds and later broadcast on BBC Radio 4, and was also made available as a box set.

Timothy X Atack credited works such as The Left Hand Of Darkness and The Word for World Is Forest by Ursula K. Le Guin as influences on the story of Forest 404. Atack cites his experiences working in the BBC Archives of natural history sounds, and specifically a Digital Audio Tape of a Sumatran rainforest recorded by Sue Western, as an inspiration for the show's premise. The inspiration to use "forest" in the title came from Rhian Roberts's childhood stomping grounds, and the full title is a reference to the 404 Not Found error—the protagonist is literally searching for the forest and is unable to find it.

=== Cast and characters ===
The show featured an all-female cast starring Pearl Mackie. The show was created in Bristol where Mackie had previously attended the Bristol Old Vic Theatre School. The characters included LGBT people and people of colour, which is uncommon in media related to climate change.

- Pearl Mackie as Pan
- Tanya Moodie as Daria
- Pippa Haywood as Theia

== Synopsis ==
In the 24th century during an era called The Fast Times, people live off-world or in crowded skyscrapers high above the Earth. After a catastrophe referred to as The Catacylsm, the majority of the world's digital information was lost and nature was destroyed. Any remaining data from before The Cataclysm is untethered from its historical context and takes up valuable space needed for the city to grow. Pan, a sound archivist working in the "heavy data" section at the Department of Convocation is tasked with cataloguing or deleting the remaining audio files from The Slow Times and she is good at her job—clearing 40 to 50 terabytes a week.

While working through the audio archives, Pan discovers a recording of a rainforest and, having never even seen a tree, is unfamiliar with the sound. Fascinated by what she believes is disjointed music, Pan begins to investigate and finds more perplexing audio files. Her boss and potential love interest, Daria, learns about her new obsession, and informs The Hands at the Department of Convocation. These automaton-like police exist to serve the "Law of Progress" and refer to the audio that Pan has uncovered as The Rupture, which has the potential to spread a deadly virus throughout the city. While the audio has a strange effect on her, Pan seems to be immune to the virus.

Daria and The Hands pursue Pan and she flees to the lower city known as Fumetown. The pursuit and Pan's investigation lead her further downward where she encounters Theia, who is the last living human. Theia is protecting an enormous underground tree and reveals that the audio clips are of nature. What the Department of Convocation calls The Rupture is nature and the deadly virus is the unbearable realisation that humans were responsible for its destruction. When listening to the audio, this realisation is so overwhelming it can be fatal. The story concludes with Pan travelling toward a radio tower to broadcast the audio file titled "Forest 404" and share the knowledge of nature and its loss with the world.

== Episodes ==
No. overall	No. in series	Title	Running time	Original release date
0	Ep0	"Enter The Forest"	2:15	5 March 2019
1	Ep1	"Life in the Fast Times"	23:15	6 March 2019
Pan works as an auditor at the Department of Convocation reviewing the remaining data from before The Cataclysm that wiped out most of the world's data. Pan's boss, Daria, reports to the faceless members of the Convocation who warn her that there is rupturous or infectious material from The Slow Times in the archives. While working overtime, Pan discovers one of these recordings and invites Daria to her flat. Daria contacts The Hands who act as the Convocation's hybridised, mechanical police force. After Daria questions Pan, she lets The Hands into the flat and they wipe her memories of the past few days.
2	T1	"Why should I listen to trees?"	8:48	7 March 2019
Alex Smalley discusses the mental effects of exposure to nature. In the 1750s, doctors experimented with ways that nature could be prescribed by constructing sea bathing hospitals. In the 1980s, an experiment was conducted where hospital patients with a view of trees tended to recover faster. Humans have begun to lose connection with nature and although advancements in technology have improved our lives, it has led to a greater divide between humans and nature. Many people live in busy cities that place constant stress on our bodies, which can cause anxiety, depression, and heart disease. The default mode network theory suggests that humans need a safe natural environment to properly rest and recover from stress.
3	S1	"Rainforest Symphony"	4:16	8 March 2019
The full length audio of the Sumatran rainforest that Pan discovered in episode one. The soundscape includes wildlife sounds such as the call of howler monkeys, a chorus of cicadas, the song of whistling thrushes, and the buzzing of flies.
4	Ep2	"The Fumetown Priest"	21:10	9 March 2019
After Pan's memories are expunged, Pan recounts a dream to Daria. When Pan describes the noises in the dream, Daria realises that Pan has subconscious memories of The Rupture. Shortly afterward, Pan finds more rupturous material, downloads it, and listens to it in the park overlooking the city. Daria follows Pan and confronts her. Pan notices The Hands approaching and escapes by leaping onto a descending lift that she rides to Fumetown. At a nearby temple, Pan speaks with an Interlocutor and discovers that humans from before The Cataclysm live in the ruins of the old city below Fumetown. Pan plays the rupturous audio for the Interlocutor and in response he steps into traffic and dies.
5	T2	"How is the sound of the world changing?"	6:21	10 March 2019
Cosmo Sheldrake discusses how the sounds of an ecosystem can be an indicator of an ecosystem's health. For instance, Bernie Krause did a field recording of Lincoln Meadow in the Sierra Nevada mountains before and after selective logging occurred and the sounds are noticeably different despite similar appearances. Generally, living organisms have a variety of calls in different frequencies that create a layered soundscape called a biophony. Noise pollution such as military sonar testing has had negative impacts on marine mammals that use sound to communicate and navigate. However, there are positive examples of humans engaging with biophonies. In a recording by Louis Sarno called "Women Gathering Mushrooms", the musical tradition of the Babenzele pygmies blends in with the surrounding ecosystem.
6	S2	"Frog Chorus"	6:52	11 March 2019
The sound of croaking frogs that Pan played for the interlocutor in Fumetown.
7	Ep3	"Into the Inner"	18:55	12 March 2019
Pan searches for a brainsmith and finds a rundown shop called Guggy's Homestyle Brain Amendments. The hungover and unkempt shopkeeper agrees to put her under and monitor her brain activity while she listens to the sounds of the Slow Times. While reviewing the results of the experiment he notes that she was feeling overwhelming sadness, which confuses Pan. He confirms that her memory was definitely wiped, but that there have been significant changes to her brain from an ancient source. Pan asks Guggy who can guide her to The Inner. After inspecting the body of the interlocutor and speaking with witnesses, Daria and The Hands torture a local con artist with brain modifications who directs them to Guggy's shop.
8	T3	"Could I live in darkness?"	8:03	13 March 2019
Herman Wijnen discusses light effects on circadian rhythms. Circadian rhythms first evolved in cyanobacteria, which rise to the ocean's surface to perform photosynthesis. In humans, circadian rhythms influence when births occur, when metabolism starts, and when hormones like testosterone increase. The circadian rhythm is an autonomous system that alternates between activators and repressors when our eyes detect light and dark, which keeps our biological rhythms in sync. Studies by Jürgen Aschoff found that humans continued to experience different biological cycles without daylight, however, they were no longer organized in a daily sequence. Humans could live in darkness with dietary supplements for vitamin D, however, there would be an increase in cancer, metabolic disease, strokes, and depression.
9	S3	"Whale Songs"	6:15	14 March 2019
The sound of whalesong that Pan listened to while having her brain activity monitored. The soundscape begins with the squawking of seabirds and the lapping of waves before plunging into the ocean and hearing the song of humpback whales, orcas, bowhead whales, and blue whales. The soundscape fades back to the squawking of seabirds before ending.
10	Ep4	"Of Earthly Delights"	23:40	15 March 2019
The Hands ransack Guggy's store and Daria discovers a map that confirms Pan's destination. Daria plans to cut them off by heading directly to the Oil Bridge, which is a barge on a toxic lake. The Oil Bridge can provide passage to The Inner for a fee that Pan can pay with one of her audio files. The boat already launched so they have to jump two levels down onto the bridge as it passes. Daria and The Hands arrive seconds too late. After paying the toll, they get inside plastic capsules that shoot down a hole in the barge. When Pan arrives in The Inner, she is standing in a large cavern on the side of a fallen skyscraper. Guggy has vanished and he stole all the sound files. Pan walks into a city of crushed buildings and hears the sound of music, which leds her to an old carpark. The atrium is lit up, and The Rupture is growing up through the center. Theia appears with a shotgun and demands that Pan step away from the tree. She says that no robots are allowed here in Birmingham. Theia shoots Pan, who exclaims at the blood. Theia says that robots don't have blood. Theia says that the world has only been populated by robots for as long as anyone can remember. Theia is the only human left.
11	T4	"Why do trees live so long?"	5:55	16 March 2019
James Aldred visits the oldest Sweet Chestnut called the Tortworth Chestnut. The oldest tree in the world is a 5,000 year old bristlecone pine called Methuselah. The tree was alive during the Bronze Age when humans were just starting to work with metal. The shape of a trees changed based on environmental pressures like weather and drought. Trees have meristematic cells that can grow into whatever the tree needs. When a branch is broken by a storm, a tree can regenerate the branch like a lizard regenerating limbs. Trees have highly compartmentalized vascular systems that allow part of the tree to survive when the rest is unable to. As long as the tree has a small stripe of bark that can still transport sap through the xylem and phloem up to the leaves, it can survive. Trees can also clone themselves using a layering process.
12	S4	"Woodland Walk"	4:56	17 March 2019
The sound of a British woodland and birdsong.
13	Ep5	"Last Days of the Slow World"	24:14	18 March 2019
14	T5	"Will we all become cyborgs?"	7:24	19 March 2019
A talk by Andy Miah.
15	S5	"Theia's Hometown"	4:39	20 March 2019
The sound of St Petersburg.
16	Ep6	"A New Leaf"	22:06	21 March 2019
17	T6	"What is death in the digital age?"	7:06	22 March 2019
A talk by Katie Thornton.
18	S6	"Pan's Dwindling"	4:51	23 March 2019
19	Ep7	"Dreams of the Autopilot"	17:57	24 March 2019
20	T7	"Would you vote for an AI government?"	7:11	25 March 2019
A talk by Elsa Sotiriadis.
21	S7	"Daria's Nightmare"	5:07	26 March 2019
22	Ep8	"Future Conditional"	20:13	27 March 2019
23	T8	"How will humans die out?"	9:55	28 March 2019
A talk by Michael Rivera.
24	S8	"The Memory Transfer"	3:53	29 March 2019
25	Ep9	"Enigmata"	25:26	30 March 2019
26	T9	"Love Letter to the Forest..."	8:28	31 March 2019
A note written by David Haskell and read by Pearl Mackie.
27	S9	"Bonobo's Theme"	3:35	1 April 2019
The show's theme song by Bonobo.

== Reception ==
The plot and writing of the show received mixed reviews from critics. Writing in The Observer, Sean O'Hagan asserted that the show was "conceptually bumpy" and contained some "jarring moments" and plot contrivances that broke his suspension of disbelief. In contrast, Torri Yearwood recommended the show in The Tech, describing the story as "beautifully believable" and praising the series for its world-building and character development. Commenting in Refinery29, Jazmin Kopotsha wrote that the show has a captivating story that draws listeners into the series, but more strongly emphasised the compelling protagonist as the driving force that keeps the listener engaged.

The show's experimental format and companion episodes received overwhelmingly positive responses from critics. Sam Fritz at the Mississippi Valley Conservancy remarked that the companion episodes allowed the show to "transcend other mediums" and provide context for the plot while grounding the narrative in reality. Recommending the show on the Australian Broadcasting Corporation, Carl Smith praised the show for its experimentation with form and for pushing the boundaries of podcasting. In the South China Morning Post, Suji Owen argued that the show's use of companion episodes deepened the themes and ideas throughout the series.

The show's sound design received positive responses from reviewers. Praising the show's use of binaural technology, Sarah Hemming expressed in the Financial Times that she felt the "richly textured soundscape" was best appreciated with headphones. Similarly, Barry Didcock of The Herald recommended listening with high quality speakers and emphasised that he enjoyed the show's sound design. Writing on the website Stuff, Katy Atkin recommended the show, calling it "a masterpiece in sound design" and asserted that it intensified the story.

=== Awards ===
Award	Date	Category	Result	Ref.
Prix Europa	2019	Best European Digital Audio Project	2nd Place	
BBC Audio Drama Awards	2020	Best Podcast or Online Audio Drama	Finalist	
Writers' Guild of Great Britain Awards	2020	Best Radio Drama	Won	
Audio and Radio Industry Awards	2020	Best Fictional Storytelling	Gold	
Earphones Awards	2021	Science Fiction	Won	

== Academic study ==
The Forest 404 Experiment was an academic study that accompanied the podcast as a collaboration between The Virtual Nature Project, the BBC Natural History Unit, BBC Radio 4, Exeter University, Bristol University and the Open University. The experiment was open to participation from 4 April 2019 until 31 October 2019, concluding with a total of 7,596 participants. The podcast encouraged listeners to take part in the study, which examined how the sounds of nature impact health. While many previous studies have focused on the general effects of nature on health, there is limited data on the specific effects of hearing nature.

The experiment was conducted on an online platform called nQuire, which was developed by Open University and the BBC. The platform was intended to provide a space for anyone to design and conduct academic studies and to facilitate mass participation in experiments. The nQuire platform was formally launched with The Forest 404 Experiment. The study was funded by the Arts and Humanities Research Council and was conducted by a team from the University of Exeter and the University of Bristol, which was led by Alex Smalley. Participants answered a series of randomised questions in response to nature sounds and poetry about nature. Many of the sounds were from the BBC natural history archives and the poetry was read by Pippa Haywood.

The results of the study were published in the journal of Global Environmental Change in May 2022. When participants listened to landscape sounds such as waves or rain they experienced therapeutic effects. If the recording included wildlife noises such as birdsong the listener was even more likely to experience relief. Similarly, whenever the audio triggered the participants' memories there was an even greater positive effect and an increased desire to preserve or protect the soundscape. If the audio did not contain wildlife sounds, the motivation to protect the soundscape decreased, which indicates that a decline in the quality of the environmental noise also led to less conservationist behaviours.

== See also ==
- List of science fiction podcasts
- List of environmental podcasts
- Dark infrastructure
