= Nat Cassidy =

American actor

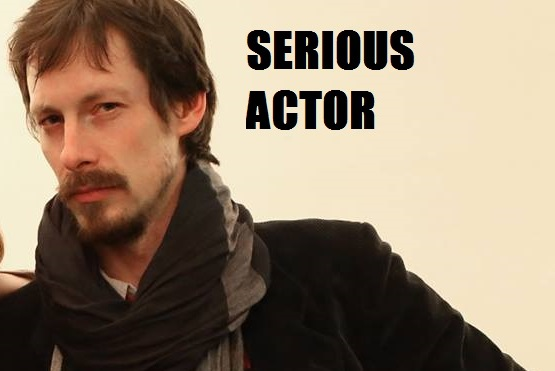
- Born: Nathaniel Cassidy; September 25, 1981 (age 45); Raleigh, North Carolina, United States
- Occupations: Actor, writer, director, musician
- Awards: New York Innovative Theatre Awards (Outstanding Full Length Script, 2009; Outstanding Solo Performance, 2011), Route 66 International Film Festival (Best Lead Actor, 2013)
- Website: http://www.natcassidy.com

Nat Cassidy (born September 25, 1981) is an American novelist, actor, playwright, and musician based out of New York City, New York, United States. He grew up in Phoenix, Arizona and attended Horizon High School, after which he received his BFA at the University of Arizona.

== Career ==
=== Actor ===
Cassidy has appeared as an actor in numerous Off- and Off-Off-Broadway productions. He has also appeared in film, television, and web projects, including the acclaimed webseries High Maintenance. In 2013, Cassidy starred in the independent horror-comedy film They Will Outlive Us All, which won numerous awards throughout the festival circuit, including winning Cassidy Best Actor in Chicago's Route 66 International Film Festival. Ain't It Cool News said of Cassidy's performance that he is "talented enough to carry this entire film." Also in 2013, he was nominated for a New York Innovative Theatre Award for Outstanding Solo Performance, for the one-man play Generic Magic Realism, by Edmond Malin. Cassidy was inducted into the Indie Theater Hall of Fame for his contributions to the NY independent theatre scene, and was described as "an actor, director, and playwright of surprising range and depth."

In 2017, Cassidy joined fellow New York independent theatre artists Mac Rogers, Jordana Williams, and Sean Williams to form Gideon Media, a company dedicated to producing "complex, riveting genre entertainment, centered on pulse-pounding tales of science fiction and horror." Along with the new podcast imprint Tor Labs (an imprint of Tor Books), Gideon Media produced their debut podcast, the acclaimed serialized sci-fi noir drama Steal the Stars (written by Rogers). Nat performed the role of xenobiologist Lloyd, as well as wrote the novelization of the podcast, which is published by Tor Books.

Nat frequently continues his work with Gideon Media, also appearing in their audio adaptations of the movie Witness (published by Audible), the play Almalem, and the original, multi-season production Give Me Away.

=== Playwright ===
Cassidy has a reputation for writing "darkly comic plays with one foot in horror and the other in literary allusion," and often feature historical characters. NYTheatre.com called him "a seismic talent" and the theater podcast Maxamoo described him as "one of the hottest young playwrights in" New York City.

His playscripts have been about, among other things, Shakespeare, Charles Lamb and Mary Lamb, H.P. Lovecraft, nuclear mutation, President Franklin Pierce, zombies, Dostoevsky, Nazi Germany, and genital warts.

In 2009, Cassidy's "metaphysical buddy comedy" about an imagined relationship between Christopher Marlowe and Caligula, The Reckoning of Kit & Little Boots, was nominated for three New York Innovative Theatre Awards and took home the award for Outstanding Full-Length Script. His play Any Day Now was also nominated for two NY IT Awards that same year, and took home Outstanding Actress in a Lead Role (Elyse Mirto). In 2011, his Lovecraft-inspired one-man show, I Am Providence or, All I Really Needed to Know about the Stygian Nightmare into Which Mankind Will Inevitably Be Devoured, Its Fruitless Screams of Agony Resounding in the Unending Chasm of Indifferent Space as It Is Digested by Squamous and Eldritch Horrors beyond Comprehension for All of Eternity, I Learned from Howard Phillips Lovecraft, won the NY IT Award for Outstanding Solo Performance. In 2014, his play Old Familiar Faces was nominated for four NYIT Awards, including Outstanding Full-Length Script, Outstanding Ensemble, Outstanding Lead Actor, and Outstanding Lead Actress. In 2015, his play The Temple, or, Lebensraum, another Lovecraft-inspired play set during Black May, was nominated for seven NYIT Awards, including Outstanding Full-Length Script, Outstanding Production, Outstanding Actor in a Lead Role (which Matthew Trumbull, the play's lead, won), Outstanding Sound Design (which its sound designer, Jeanne Travis, won), Outstanding Lighting Design, Outstanding Costume Design, and Outstanding Scenic Design.

In 2012, Cassidy was one of four librettists commissioned by The Kennedy Center/Washington National Opera in the first-ever American Opera Initiative. With composer Scott Perkins, he wrote the short opera "Charon," a loose adaptation of a story fragment by Lord Dunsany, which the Washington Times called "remarkable," "brilliant," and that "Mr. Cassidy’s libretto is what any composer could want." His work has been produced mainly in New York City, but has also seen productions across the country, including Oklahoma, Wisconsin, and Chicago His plays have been published by Samuel French, Broadway Play Publishing, New York Theater Experience, Smith & Kraus, Applause Books, and Indie Theater Now.

=== Novelist ===
Nat has been named one "of the best horror writers of this generation" and one of "the writers shaping horror's next golden age" by Esquire.

His first published book, a novelization of the podcast Steal the Stars, was published on November 7, 2017, by Tor Books and named one of the "best new books of November 2017" by the Chicago Review of Books and one of the best books of 2017 by NPR.

Nat's original debut novel, Mary: An Awakening of Terror, was published on July 19, 2022, by Tor Nightfire. It was named one of the best books of that year by Esquire, Paste Magazine, CrimeReads, and The Lineup, and one of "the best books for spooky season" by Harper's Bazaar. In 2024, Goodreads included it as one of "the most popular horror novels of the past five years" and its audiobook, narrated by Susan Bennett, was named one of the "Top 100 Horror Books of All Time" by Audible.

Nat's follow up novel, Nestlings, was published on October 31, 2023, by Tor Nightfire. It was named one of the best books of that year by NPR, the New York Public Library, Esquire, and others.

In 2024, he published a novella (Rest Stop) and two chapbooks with the independent publishers, Shortwave. Rest Stop was named one of the best horror books of that year by Den of Geek and Esquire.

In 2024, the Line-Up described Nat as the "Stephen King of TikTok," due to the "many readers including [his works] on their top reading lists."

His novel, When the Wolf Comes Home, was published by Tor Nightfire in April 2025.

== Appearances ==
=== Television ===
Year	Film	Role	Notes
2013	High Maintenance	Nat	Original webseries episode: "Brad Pitts"
2015	The Following	Josh	Episode 310: "Evermore"
2015	Red Oaks	Sous Chef	Episode 105: "Forth of July"
2015	The Affair	Moderator	Episode 208
2017	Law & Order: Special Victims Unit	Kevin Dorsey	Episode 1808: "Chasing Theo"
2017	Bull	Brian McCannon	Episode 206: "The Exception to the Rule"
2017	Blue Bloods	Duane Pitney	Episode 808: "Pick Your Poison"
2018	The Good Fight	Bernard Radosh	Episode 204: "Day 429"
2018	The Last O.G.	Fast Food Manager	Episode 102: "Bobo Beans"
2018	Quantico	Lester Joe Blanks	Episode 302: "Fear and Flesh"
2019	Instinct	Jay Moseby	Episode 204: "Big Splash"
2020	The Iliza Shleshinger Sketch Show	Thomaz	Episode 105
2021	FBI	Bill McCain	Episode 409: "Unfinished Business"

=== Film ===
- They Will Outlive Us All
- The Moose Head Over the Mantle
- Android Insurrection
- Total Retribution
- Battle: New York, Day 2

=== Off-Broadway and independent theatre ===
- Hamlet (Hamlet)
- King Kirby (as Stan Lee), by Fred Van Lente and Crystal Skillman
- The Runner Stumbles
- Lickspittles, Buttonholers, and Damned Pernicious Go-Betweens
- As You Like It
- Honey Fist
- The Rise and Fall of Miles & Milo
- Good

== Scripts ==
=== Full-length ===
- Any Day Now
- The Reckoning of Kit & Little Boots
- The Temple, or, Lebensraum, loosely inspired by an H. P. Lovecraft story
- Tenants, or, When the Hornet Arrives
- The Eternal Husband
- Old Familiar Faces
- I Am Providence or, All I Really Needed to Know about the Stygian Nightmare into Which Mankind Will Inevitably Be Devoured, Its Fruitless Screams of Agony Resounding in the Unending Chasm of Indifferent Space as It Is Digested by Squamous and Eldritch Horrors beyond Comprehension for All of Eternity, I Learned from Howard Phillips Lovecraft
- Goldsboro
- Pierce
- Songs of Love: A Theatrical Mixtape
- The Blood Brothers Present Bedlam Nightmares

=== Short plays ===
- Generation
- Roosterbrood
- Joy Junction
- Sparks Will Fly (a song cycle)
- All in Good Fun (a song cycle)
- Into the Life of Things
- Charon (libretto)

== Novels ==
- Steal the Stars (a novelization of the podcast by Mac Rogers), 2017, Tor Books, ISBN 978-1250172624
- Mary: An Awakening of Terror, 2022, Tor Books, ISBN 9781250265234
- Nestlings, 2023, Tor Books, ISBN 9781250265258
- When the Wolf Comes Home, 2025, Tor Books, ISBN 9781250354341

== Novellas ==
- Rest Stop, 2024, Shortwave Publishing, ISBN 9781959565369

== Collections ==
- I Know a Place, 2026, Shortwave Publishing, ISBN 9798897320165
