= The Cipher =

Science fiction thriller podcast by BBC

- Genre: drama fiction podcast, fiction podcast

Publication
- No. of episodes: 13
- Provider: BBC Sounds

Reception
- Ratings: 4.076923076923077/5

Related
- Website: www.bbc.co.uk/programmes/p090t9cl

The Cipher is a science fiction thriller podcast by Goldhawk Productions and BBC Sounds starring Anya Chalotra and Chance Perdomo.

== Background ==
The podcast debuted in late December 2020 and reached #1 on the iTunes' drama chart as well as #5 on the fiction chart. The podcast was recorded during the COVID-19 pandemic. The show was produced by Goldhawk Productions. The show is on BBC Sounds and is available as a boxset. John Dryden, the director of Passenger List also directed The Cipher. The show stars Anya Chalotra and Chance Perdomo. The show is a science fiction thriller podcast that follows the story of a protagonist named Sabrina. The podcast was a 2021 nominee for best scripted fiction podcast at the Webby Awards.
