= Steal the Stars =

Science fiction podcast

Steal the Stars is a science fiction podcast produced by Tor Labs and created by Mac Rogers.

== Background ==
The show is a serialized audio drama produced by Tor Labs. Tor Labs was started by Jen Gunnels and Marco Palmieri. The show was written and created by Mac Rogers, directed by Jordana Williams, and produced by Sean Williams. Mac Rogers was previously the writer for The Message and LifeAfter. The show debuted on August 2, 2017. The show released 14 episodes weekly on a weekly basis until November 1, 2017. The show has a cast of 24 actors. The show is a science fiction love story set in a dystopian future. The story follows protagonists Dakota Prentiss and Matt Salem, ex-military employees at a lab deep underground, protecting an extraterrestrial secret. The podcast was concurrently adapted and expanded into a prose novel by Nat Cassidy (who also played the character of Lloyd in the show), and the novel was published to correspond with the release of the series' final episode. The podcast was a 2019 finalist in the Audie Awards.
