= The Deca Tapes =

Science fiction podcast

The Deca Tapes is a science fiction podcast created by Lex Noteboom and distributed by REALM.

== Background ==
This science-fiction thriller podcast was written, produced and scored by Lex Noteboom. It consists of eight episodes in the style of found footage or recovered audio, where each episode features leaked recordings that tell the story of ten people. Lex Noteboom quit his job to work on the series. The podcast was created in the Netherlands, but is in the English language. The A.V. Club called the podcast the best speculative fiction series of 2019.

The second season of the show has been produced after a successful crowdfunding campaign and will be released July 30th 2025. It is said to be a stand-alone story, consisting of thirteen episodes.

=== Awards ===
Award	Date	Category	Result	Ref.
Dutch Podcast Awards	2019	Best narrative podcast	Nominated	
Webby Awards	2020	Best scripted fiction podcast	Nominated	
The Lovie Awards	2020	Podcast	Finalist	

== Plot ==
Season 1 (Episodes 1–8)

The story follows ten characters, with each episode being told from a different perspective. The characters are confined to a small building containing only eight rooms and seem not to have any memories of their lives before arriving there. They are named after the roles they fulfill within this closed system. The main mystery of the show is the reason behind, and true meaning off their situation.

Episode 1 — The Cleaner (Nick Messina)

Episode 2 — The Teacher (Nadja Freeman)

Episode 3 — The Cook (Sarah Ruth Thomas)

Episode 4 — The Doctor (Nikki SooHoo)

Episode 5 — The Communicator (Addison Peacock)

Episode 6 — The Fixer (Casper Stokhuyzen)

Episode 7 — The Farmer (Leo Wiggins)

Episode 8 — The Mystery Function (Casper Stokhuyzen)

The Leader and The Entertainer do not have designated episodes.

Season 2 (Episodes 9–21)

Jonathan Tozer (Trent Shumway) is looking for his daughter, who appears to have either been kidnapped or joined a cult called "The Concentrix". Amanda (Lindsay Zana), a private investigator, is investigating a disappearance connected to the same group.
