= Janus Descending =

Science fiction and horror podcast

Janus Descending is a science fiction and horror podcast produced by No Such Thing Productions. The show stars Jordan Cobb and Anthony Olivieri with music inspired by The Last Five Years. The story is nonlinear and follows two xenoarchaeologists named Peter and Chel who are exploring an alien planet.

== Background ==
The story is a blend of horror and science fiction and follows the experiences of two xenoarchaeologists who are exploring an alien planet. The podcast tells the story non-linearly with episodes from the perspective of Chel moving forward in time while the episodes from the perspective of Peter move backward in time. The podcast drew inspiration from the musical The Last Five Years. The podcast stars Jordan Cobb and Anthony Olivieri. The podcast is a single season long and the creators made a supercut of all of the episodes.

== Reception ==
The show won best "Instrumental Composition in a New Production" as well as best "Action Sound Design in a New Production" at the 2019 Audio Verse Awards. Phoebe Lett wrote in The New York Times that Cobb "masterfully weaves the dueling narratives in such a way that your expectations are subverted." Ross Johnson wrote in Lifehacker that the show has an "atmosphere rich in wonder and horror." Christina Orlando wrote on Tor.com that "The worldbuilding here is spectacular." Aigner Loren Wilson wrote in Discover Pods that the show is "A terrifying tragedy ... you won't soon forget."
