= Slate Political Gabfest =

Political podcast

- Slate Political Gabfest cover image
- Format: Weekly political commentary
- Country of origin: United States
- Language: English

Cast and voices
- Hosted by: David Plotz; Emily Bazelon; John Dickerson

Production
- Production: Steve Lickteig
- Length: 40–60 minutes

Technical specifications
- Audio format: Stereophonic; MP3

Publication
- Original release: December 2005 – present
- Provider: The Slate Group; The Washington Post Company

Related
- Website: slate.com/podcasts/political-gabfest

The Slate Political Gabfest is an American political podcast by Slate magazine that covers topics on current politics and issues featuring David Plotz, Emily Bazelon and John Dickerson.

== Podcast ==
The show is usually hosted by former Slate editor David Plotz with regular contributors Emily Bazelon and John Dickerson, likewise Slate alums. It covers three political topics in the week's news. Each topic is discussed from various viewpoints, and the podcast runs about 40 minutes to an hour. Ads are incorporated into the show between topics, with Plotz or one of the other contributors describing the product in a casual way, similar to the manner of early radio and television shows. The Slate Plus version of the program omits advertising spots and adds a shorter bonus section after the closing credits.

The group typically treats Dickerson as their expert on Washington politics and presidential campaigns. Bazelon is turned to for her legal expertise as well as for her experience reporting on online bullying and child sexual abuse. Notable guests of the show have included Stephen Colbert, John Hickenlooper, David French, Jamelle Bouie and Farhad Manjoo.

Plotz, Bazelon, and Dickerson reportedly do not discuss topics with each other before going live.

== History ==
The Slate Political Gabfest was launched in December 2005. Andy Bowers, executive producer of the podcast, initially read articles from Slate for the podcast, but he said he was struck by how much he enjoyed the magazine's editorial meetings and thought that listeners would also enjoy the banter and analysis if he could capture it on audio. He provided Plotz, Bazelon and Dickerson with the basic structure of the gabfest and a small studio at Slate's Washington headquarters.

From 2012 until 2014, an abridged version of the show was also broadcast on the radio alongside the Culture Gabfest.

On November 10, 2009, the panel held its first live show at the Sixth & I Historic Synagogue in Washington, D.C. That event was the first of what has become a key arm of Slate's podcasting business: live shows. According to Faith Smith, executive producer for Slate Live, live shows are profitable financially, inspire audience loyalty and encourage listeners to join Slate Plus, the website's paid membership program. This live Gabfest is also considered the earliest example in a growing trend of live events from podcast producers including WNYC and Gimlet Media.

== Reception ==
In 2012, it was reported to be Slate's most popular podcast. In October 2013, the show peaked at #4 on the US iTunes podcasts charts. As of February 2012, Political Gabfest has over 75,000 weekly listeners. Some fans have reportedly driven hours or flown from several states away to attend live shows.

Chris Campling of The Times (London) named it his podcast of the week for February 2, 2008. In 2011, the entire Slate series of podcasts received an Advertising Age "Media Vanguard Award" for Digital Native/Best Podcast Series with a specific mention of the Political Gabfest. In November 2012, the Slate Political Gabfest won iTunes informal Facebook poll for the best political podcast.

== See also ==
- Political podcast
