= Electric Easy =

Musical science fiction podcast

- Genre: Science fiction, music
- Country of origin: United States
- Language: English

Cast and voices
- Starring: Kesha; Chloe Bailey; Mason Gooding

Publication
- Original release: 2021 – 2021
- Provider: QCode

Related
- Website: qcodemedia.com/electric-easy

Electric Easy is a science fiction podcast and musical produced by QCode starring Kesha, Chloe Bailey, and Mason Gooding.

== Background ==
The podcast was produced by QCode and created by Vanya Asher. The show was produced using Dolby Atmos. The podcast was recorded remotely during the COVID-19 pandemic. Each episode is told from a different character's point of view. The podcast is set in a futuristic Los Angeles. The podcast stars Kesha as an electric named Zephyr, who works as the MC at a nightclub called Electric Easy. Chloe Bailey stars as an electric named Vector, who is a performer at Electric Easy. Mason Gooding stars as Lucky, who is a gang member. The show was nominated for a Webby Award in 2022. Morgan McNaught wrote in The A.V. Club that "the audio is sexy and lush".
