= Gideon Glick =

American actor (born 1988)

- Glick in 2026
- Born: June 6, 1988 (age 38); Philadelphia, Pennsylvania, U.S.
- Education: New York University (BA)
- Occupations: Actor, writer, singer
- Years active: 2005–present
- Known for: Étoile, The Marvelous Mrs. Maisel
- Spouse: Perry Dubin (m. 2019)
- Relatives: Michael Glick (father)

Gideon Glick (born June 6, 1988) is a Tony nominated American actor and writer. He wrote and starred on the Amazon series Étoile.

Other selected screen work includes Maestro, The Other Two, and American Horror Story: NYC.

He was nominated for the 2019 Tony Award for Best Featured Actor in a Play for his performance in Aaron Sorkin's adaptation of Harper Lee's To Kill a Mockingbird.

== Early life ==
Glick was born into a Jewish family in Philadelphia, and raised by professors who met initially at Hebrew University in Israel. His father is dentist and researcher Michael Glick. Gideon has been deaf in his right ear since birth. During his senior year of high school, he moved to New York City to originate the role of Ernst in the hit musical Spring Awakening. He attended Jack M. Barrack Hebrew Academy, Lower Merion High School and was a student at New York University before leaving to be in Spring Awakening. He later returned to complete a degree in art history.

== Career ==
Glick's first major role was playing Ernst, an adolescent boy in love with his classmate, Hanschen, in the original cast of the hit musical Spring Awakening. The play premiered at the Atlantic Theatre Company Off-Broadway, but later transferred along with co-stars Jonathan Groff, John Gallagher Jr. and Lea Michele, to the Eugene O'Neill Theatre on Broadway. The same year, Glick made his silver screen debut as Slap in the film One Last Thing... alongside Cynthia Nixon and Ethan Hawke.

His next major theater role was as Howie in Speech & Debate (Roundabout Underground), a play by Stephen Karam. The play began in October 2007 and ran until early 2008.

Glick returned to Broadway in the role of Jimmy-6, a member of the four-person Geek Chorus in Julie Taymor's Broadway production of Spider-Man: Turn Off the Dark. However, Glick and the rest of the Geek Chorus were cut after Taymor was forced out as director. After co-starring in MCC's production of Wild Animals You Should Know, Glick went on to portray Jack in The Public Theater's production of Stephen Sondheim's Into the Woods alongside Amy Adams and Denis O'Hare.

In 2014, Glick was profiled in The New York Times for his lauded performance as Matthew in The Few by Samuel D. Hunter. He then was cast in his first recurring role as Ty McKay, the second season villain, on Devious Maids on Lifetime.

His first starring role was in Significant Other as Jordan Berman, alongside Barbara Barrie. The play was written by Joshua Harmon and premiered at Roundabout Theatre Company's Laura Pels Theater in 2015. The highly acclaimed, sold-out production transferred to Broadway's Booth Theater in 2016. He received a Drama League Award nomination for this performance. He next played Kyle McCallister in the Warner Bros. feature film, Ocean's 8, which was followed by a recurring role on The Detour on TBS.

He starred in Aaron Sorkin's 2018 stage adaptation of the novel To Kill a Mockingbird, alongside Jeff Daniels as Atticus Finch, produced by Scott Rudin. Glick played Dill Harris, the visiting friend of Scout and Jem Finch. The role is modeled on Harper Lee's childhood best friend, Truman Capote. In January 2020, Glick assumed the role of Seymour in the off-Broadway revival of Little Shop of Horrors; he had previously portrayed the role in a temporary capacity for two weeks in November 2019.

== Personal life ==
Glick is gay and came out early in 7th grade. He married hospitalist Perry Dubin in November 2019.

== Filmography ==
=== Film ===
Year	Title	Role	Notes
2005	One Last Thing...	Slap	
2013	Gods Behaving Badly	Eros	
2014	Song One	Everett	
2017	Speech & Debate	Gideon	
2018	Ocean's 8	Kyle McCallister	
2019	Marriage Story	Theater Actor	
2022	Spring Awakening: Those You've Known	Himself	Documentary
2022	White Noise	Simuvac Technician	
2022	The Pale Blue Eye	Cadet Horatio Cochrane	
2023	Maestro	Tommy Cothran	

=== Television ===
Year	Title	Role	Notes
2013	Wallflowers	Todd	4 episodes
2014	Devious Maids	Ty McKay	Season regular; 9 episodes
2013–14	It Could Be Worse	Phillip Klein	Series regular; 17 episodes
2015	Man Seeking Woman	Scientist	Episode: "Traib"
2016	The Good Wife	Blake Reedy	Episode: "Monday"
2016	Margot vs. Lily	Glenn	Series regular; 5 episodes
2016	Elementary	Dennis Karig	Episode: "Render, and Then Seize Her"
2018	The Detour	Straight Jack	3 episodes
2021	The Other Two	Jess	4 episodes
2022–23	The Marvelous Mrs. Maisel	Alfie	Recurring role (Season 4–5); 8 episodes
2022	American Horror Story: NYC	Cameron Dietrich	Recurring role; 6 episodes
2025	Étoile	Tobias Bell	Series regular

=== Stage appearances ===
Year	Title	Role	Theater	Notes
2006–07	Spring Awakening	Ernst	Atlantic Theater Company: May 19 – August 5, 2006	Off-Broadway
2006–07	Spring Awakening	Ernst	Eugene O'Neill Theater: November 16, 2006 –August 25, 2007	Broadway
2007–08	Speech & Debate	Howie	Roundabout Theater Company: October 5 – February 24, 2008	Off-Broadway
2009	Population: 8		SoHo Playhouse (FringeNYC): August 18–30, 2009	Off-Broadway
2010–11	Spider-Man: Turn Off the Dark	Jimmy-6	Lyric Theatre: November 28, 2010 – April 18, 2011	Broadway
2011	Wild Animals You Should Know	Jacob	MCC Theater: November 4 – December 11, 2011	Off-Broadway
2012	Into the Woods	Jack	Delacorte Theater (Shakespeare in the Park): July 23 – September 1, 2012	Off-Broadway
2013–14	The Few	Matthew	The Old Globe Theatre: September 28 – October 27, 2013	Regional
2013–14	The Few	Matthew	Rattlestick Playwrights Theater: April 23 – June 21, 2014	Off-Broadway
2015	Significant Other	Jordan Berman	Roundabout Theater Company: May 21 – August 16, 2015	Off-Broadway
2017	Significant Other	Jordan Berman	Booth Theatre: February 14 – April 23, 2017	Broadway
2016	The Harvest	Tom	Lincoln Center Theatre: October 8 – November 20, 2016	Off-Broadway
2018–19	To Kill a Mockingbird	Charles Baker "Dill" Harris	Shubert Theatre: November 1, 2018 – November 3, 2019	Broadway; Tony Award Nomination
2019–20	Little Shop of Horrors	Seymour Krelborn	Westside Theatre: November 5–17, 2019 (temporary replacement); January 21, 2020 – March 12, 2020 (full-time)	Off-Broadway
2021	Spring Awakening	Ernst	Imperial Theatre: November 15, 2021	Broadway Concert

Staged readings and concerts

- 2009: How Can You Run with a Shell on Your Back? (An Aesop's Fables Musical) – New Worlds Stages (21st Annual Festival of New Musicals)
- 2010: Sons of the Prophet – Susan Stein Shiva Theater (Powerhouse Theater)
- 2018: The Destiny of Me (Alexander) – Lucille Lortel Theatre

=== Other media ===
Year	Title	Role	Medium	Note
2016	The Message	Mod	Podcast	Series regular
2017	Modern Love	Just Don't Call Me Mom	Podcast	Episode 66
2019–20	The Two Princes	Percy Junior	Podcast	Recurring role

== Awards and nominations ==
Year	Award	Category	Work	Result	Ref
2017	Drama League Award	Distinguished Performance	Significant Other	Nominated	
2017	Broadway.com Audience Awards	Favorite Leading Actor in a play	Significant Other	Nominated	
2019	Tony Awards	Best Featured Actor in a Play	To Kill a Mockingbird	Nominated	
2019	Broadway.com Audience Awards	Favorite Featured Actor in a Play	To Kill a Mockingbird	Nominated	
