= The Message (podcast) =

Science fiction podcast

- Genre: Science fiction
- Language: English

Creative team
- Written by: Mac Rogers
- Directed by: Rachel Wolther

Cast and voices
- Hosted by: Nicky Tomalin, portrayed by Annapurna Sriram
- Starring: Annapurna Sriram; Kathy Keane; Robert Stanton; Meryl Jones Williams; Gideon Glick; Emma Galvin; Meetu Chilana; Brian Haley; Gene Jones; Darius Homayoun

Production
- Length: 12–24 minutes

Publication
- No. of seasons: 1
- No. of episodes: 8
- Original release: October 4 – November 22, 2015
- Provider: Panoply

Related
- Website: themessagepodcast.com

The Message is a science fiction podcast co-produced by Panoply and GE Podcast Theater. Diegetically its title is CypherCast, and it is hosted by the fictional character Nicky Tomalin, portrayed by Annapurna Sriram. Tomalin's fictional podcast covers the decoding of a message from outer space received 70 years ago. Over the course of 8 weeks, listeners follow a team of top cryptologists as they attempt to decipher, decode, and understand the alien message. It won the Webby Award in 2016 for the best use of native advertising.

== Premise ==
The Message, hosted by Nicky Tomalin, follows a team from a modern-day cryptography consultant group, called Cipher Centers For Communication, as they attempt to decode The Message. The first episode of the show aired on October 4, 2015.

The Message (Transmission 7-21-45) is the name given to a fictional transmission that is being investigated in the podcast. The transmission was received by Officer Marvin Weller at Station Hypo (a signal station) in Hawaii during World War II on July 21, 1945, and is believed to be of extraterrestrial origin.

The Message met SETI’s Standards For Intelligent Extraterrestrial Life (repetition, spectral width, extrasolar origin, metadata, and Terran elimination) by a team of codebreakers led by cryptographer, Lewis Krell. Krell's character is loosely based on the British cryptanalyst, Alan Turing.

After hearing the transmission while stationed at Hypo in Hawaii, Officer Marvin Weller reported to his unit. The transmission left the military cryptologists perplexed, so they sent the recording to the NSA. After a team of senior intelligence officers and cryptographers began testing the transmission and determined it was not a super-encrypted Japanese code, their assumptions led them to believe it was an alien transmission.

== Synopsis ==
The series follows a team of cryptographers as they try to decode an extraterrestrial transmission referred to as "The Message", as they are followed by a civilian podcaster named Nicky. Listening to the transmission puts people at risk of Pulmonary Anomaly 1, which causes the individual to experience difficulty breathing that worsens until they fall into a coma and eventually die. The team is quarantined after one of their members catches PA1, and after it's determined that the ailment is contagious, as someone can catch it even without listening to the Message. While the team is quarantined, an additional member develops PA1. Nicky notices that both members mention a "city made of song". She removes episodes of her podcast that feature the Message, only for this to have little effect in slowing the spread of PA1.

The team is joined by Singh, a researcher and physician who has been studying the use of sound as a tool for healing and rehab, specifically in the use of sound vibrations and the human brain. With her help, the team discovers that the transmission purposely causes pulmonary failure so that the individual can experience near death, during which they are given a message. Having recently contracted PA1, Ty volunteers to endure a near-death experience so they can receive the complete message in hopes of discovering a cure. While they do manage to retrieve almost all of the message, the team quickly discovers that the message itself isn't a cure. They do manage, with the help of Singh, to successfully discover a cure in time to save the remaining living team members with PA1.

In the aftermath of Ty's near-death experience, fellow team member Robin confronts Nicky, having realized that she was a member of the alien race who sent the Message to Earth. Nicky knew things that a random civilian wouldn't possibly know, things that were only in government documents to which she would have no access. Nicky confirms Robin's suspicions and that the Message was a tool for humanity to use as they wished. Her race had tried giving their technology directly to other races before, only for it to end in disaster. Before disappearing, Nicky tells Robin that "they" will continue to watch humanity to discover how they make use of the Message.

== Characters ==
- Nicky Tomalin: The host of the podcast.
- Robin Lyons: An American computer scientist, cryptographer, and former member of the National Security Agency, she founded the Cypher Centers For Communications alongside Ty Waldman.
- Ty Waldman: An American computer scientist, cryptographer, ex-member of the National Security Agency (NSA) and co-founder of and lead cryptographer at Cypher Centers For Communications.
- Lewis Krell: An American computer scientist, mathematician, and cryptographer for the U.S. Navy and National Security Agency who worked on The Message during the 1970s.

== Alternate reality game ==
An alternate reality game has been created for the promotion of the podcast and engagement of the listeners.
