= Wolf 359 (podcast) =

Science fiction podcast

- Genre: Science fiction, space opera
- Language: English

Creative team
- Created by: Gabriel Urbina
- Written by: Gabriel Urbina; Sarah Shachat; Zach Valenti
- Directed by: Gabriel Urbina

Publication
- No. of seasons: 4
- No. of episodes: 61
- Original release: August 15, 2014 – December 25, 2017
- Updates: Complete

Related
- Website: www.wolf359.fm

Wolf 359 is a science fiction podcast created by Gabriel Urbina and produced by Gabriel Urbina, Zach Valenti and Sarah Shachat under Kinda Evil Genius Productions. Following in the tradition of Golden Age radio dramas, Wolf 359 tells the story of a dysfunctional space station crew orbiting the star Wolf 359 on a deep space survey mission. The show starts off as lighthearted comedy that focuses on character dynamics before becoming more of a thriller. After 61 episodes, the show concluded on December 25, 2017.

Wolf 359 made over $3000 per episode from over 900 patrons on Patreon before the series ended. As of 2018, the podcast had over 6 million downloads. Urbina regularly participates in panels and workshops regarding audio dramas and their future. Many alumni of the show have gone on to participate in other audio projects.

== Content ==
=== Synopsis ===
Wolf 359 begins as a series of audio logs recorded by Doug Eiffel, showing the life of the skeleton crew on board the U.S.S. Hephaestus. Doug Eiffel's job on board the station is to scan for signs of alien life, but instead he finds recordings of classical music from Earth. After realizing the recordings are too old to have come from Earth, Dr. Hilbert, the station's science officer, sends this information to Goddard Futuristics, the company funding the mission before attempting a coup on the station. After a struggle, Eiffel and Minkowski manage to regain control of the ship and incapacitate Hilbert. The crew finds out that they were never intended to leave the station, and the show focuses more on the rest of the ensemble cast as it becomes a dramatic science fiction adventure.

=== Characters ===
- Doug Eiffel – voiced by Zach Valenti. Communications officer and primary narrator of Wolf 359, Eiffel is a consummate slacker who prefers finding creative ways to ignore his duties to actually performing them.
- Renée Minkowski – voiced by Emma Sherr-Ziarko. Commander and navigations specialist of the U.S.S. Hephaestus mission. A straight-laced former Air Force pilot, Minkowski is fulfilling her dream of commanding a deep space mission.
- Hera – voiced by Michaela Swee. Hera is an Artificial Intelligence tasked with managing the station's many automatic systems, but with a concerning propensity for glitches.
- Dr. Alexander Hilbert – voiced by Zach Valenti. Chief science officer. Dr. Hilbert is a reserved and reclusive man with a towering intellect. He says he is on the Hephaestus mission to experiment on microbes utilizing Wolf 359's unique radiation.
- Marcus Cutter – voiced by Scotty Shoemaker. Director of Communications for Goddard Futuristics. The de facto head of Goddard Futuristics, Mr. Cutter takes a personal interest in the mission to Wolf 359.
- Isabel Lovelace – voiced by Cecilia Lynn-Jacobs. Commander of the previous U.S.S. Hephaestus mission.
- Warren Kepler – voiced by Zach Libresco. Director of Intelligence for Goddard's Special Projects division.
- Daniel Jacobi – voiced by Noah Masur. Demolitions expert with the Special Projects SI-5 unit.
- Dr. Alana Maxwell – voiced by Michelle Agresti. A.I. specialist with the Special Projects SI-5 unit.
- Dr. Miranda Pryce – voiced by Michaela Swee. A.I. specialist implied to have originated A.I. herself. Creator of many biotechnical enhancements to both her and Cutter's bodies.
- Rachel Young – voiced by Ariela Rotenberg. Director of Special Projects for Goddard Futuristics. She works closely with Cutter.
- Victor Riemann – voiced by Julian Silver. Nonexistent on company records, he works for Goddard Futuristics. Unofficially, Riemann is a high-ranking black ops agent for Pryce and Cutter.

== Reception ==
In 2018, Morgan Hines called Wolf 359 "one of just a handful independent podcasts that have been successful without the backing of a network." The show received favorable mentions from critics at publications such as The New York Times, Time Out, Reactor, and Book Riot, and was nominated for several industry awards.

=== Audio Verse Awards ===
Year	Category	Recipient	Result	Ref
2015	Best Original Composition in an Original, Long-Form Production	"Welcome to Wolf 359" by Alan Rodi	Won	
2015	Best Writing of an Original, Long-Form, Serial Production	Gabriel Urbina and Sarah Shachat	Won	
2015	Best Actress with a Supporting Role in an Original, Short-Form, Serial Production	Michaela Swee as Hera	Won	
2015	Best Original Long-Form, Serial Comedy	Wolf 359	Won	
2015	Best Original, Long-Form, Small Cast, Serial Production	Wolf 359	Won	
2016	Best Original, Long Form, Small Cast, Ongoing, Dramatic Production	Wolf 359	Won	
2016	Best Performance of an Actress in an Original Ensemble Role for a Long Form Production	Cecilia Lynn-Jacobs as Captain Isabel Lovelace	Won	
2016	Best Performance of an Actress in an Original Supporting Role for a Long Form, Small Cast Production	Michaela Swee as Hera	Won	
2016	Best Performance of an Actress in an Original Leading Role for a Long Form Production	Emma Sherr-Ziarko as Renée Minkowski	Won	
2016	Best Performance of an Actor in an Original Supporting Role for a Long Form, Small Cast Production	Zach Libresco as Warren Kepler	Won	
2016	Best Performance of an Actor in an Original Leading Role for a Long Form, Small Cast Production	Zach Valenti as Doug Eiffel	Won	
2017	Best Music for an Ongoing Dramatic Production	"But How Do We Tell The Children We Are Allergic To Their Smiles" by Alan Rodi	Won	
2017	Best Production for an Ongoing Dramatic Production	Wolf 359	Won	
2017	Best Actress in an Ensemble role for an Ongoing Dramatic Production	Michaela Swee as Hera	Won	
2017	Best Actor in an Ensemble role for an Ongoing, Dramatic, Production	Zach Valenti as Doug Eiffel	Won	
2018	Best Ongoing, Long-form, Dramatic Production	Wolf 359	Won	
2018	Best Writing of an Ongoing, Long-form, Dramatic Production	Gabriel Urbina, Sarah Shachat, Zach Valenti	Won	
2018	Best Performance of a Role in the Ensemble of an Ongoing, Dramatic Production	Zach Valenti as Doug Eiffel	Won	

=== Parsec Awards ===
Year	Category	Recipient	Result	Ref
2016	Best Speculative Fiction Audio Drama (Long Form)	Wolf 359 "Mayday" by Gabriel Urbina and Kinda Evil Genius Productions	Finalist	

=== Webby Awards ===
Year	Category	Recipient	Result	Ref
2017	Podcasts & Digital Audio – Drama	Wolf 359	Nominated	
