= The Gist =

News podcast

- Genre: Daily news show
- Running time: Approximately 25 to 40 minutes
- Country of origin: United States
- Language: English
- Hosted by: Mike Pesca
- Produced by: Joel Patterson (Sr.); Corey Wara (Asst.); Mary Wilson (former); Andrea Silensi (former)
- Executive producer: Andy Bowers (former)
- Recording studio: New York City
- Original release: May 2014 – present
- Audio format: Stereophonic/MP3
- Website: www.mikepesca.com/thegist

The Gist is an American daily news podcast hosted by Mike Pesca. The show was originally produced by Slate magazine starting in May 2014 and was suspended by Slate on February 22, 2021. A year later, Pesca relaunched the podcast under his independent production company, Peach Fish Productions.

== Podcast ==
The show typically starts with a short solo discussion by Pesca of an issue in the news, continues with an interview with an expert or author, and concludes with a "spiel", which is a short op-ed by Pesca on some topic that may or may not have already been discussed in the podcast. Beyond issues of current events and politics, a notable focus of the Gist is on the quality of arguments and use of wordplay.

New episodes of the show are released afternoons daily during the week.

On the June 29, 2026, the episode opened with Mike announcing, "... in an announcement, a sad one that I did not want to make, The Gist as we know it is ending." He also indicated that the upcoming Thursday episode would be the last and further explications would be forthcoming.

The Gist's average rating is 4.6 out of 5 on Apple Podcasts.

== Controversy ==
Slate suspended Pesca and The Gist following a debate between Pesca and other Slate staff over a controversy involving journalist Donald G. McNeil. McNeil said the n-word “in the context of a conversation about racist language" during a New York Times's sponsored trip with students. Pesca opined that McNeil's conduct should not result in him being fired.

In early September 2021, the Washington Post reported that Pesca and Slate had “mutually agreed to part ways … As part of the arrangement, Pesca will take his podcast, 'The Gist,' to an independent platform.”

== See also ==
- List of daily news podcasts
- Political podcast
