= Mike Pesca =

American journalist

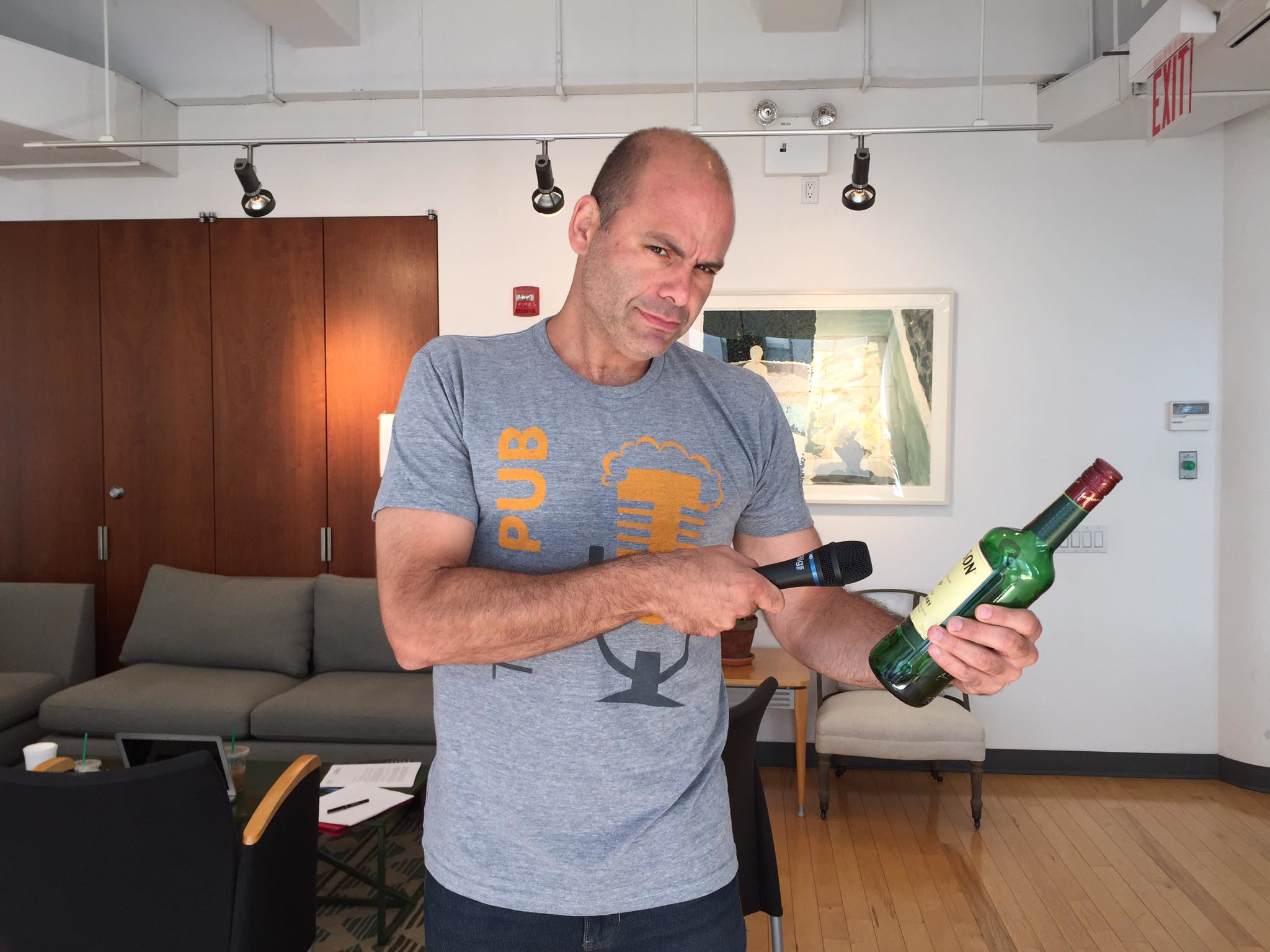
- Pesca in 2016
- Born: December 29, 1971 (age 54); Oceanside, New York, U.S.
- Education: Emory University
- Occupation: Radio journalist for Peach Fish Productions
- Notable credit(s): Morning Edition, All Things Considered, Weekend Edition, Hang Up and Listen
- Spouse: Michelle Hunter Pesca
- Children: 2

Mike Pesca (born December 29, 1971) is an American radio journalist and podcaster based in New York City. He is the host of the daily podcast, The Gist, and the editor of Upon Further Review: The Greatest What-Ifs in Sports History.

== Career ==
Mike Pesca first appeared on radio as a ten-year-old caller to a local New York City sports program, offering his opinion on the New York Jets. In 1997, Pesca got his first job in radio, as an intern at the station working on New York & Co, which would later become The Leonard Lopate Show.

Pesca went on to work as Producer-At-Large for the WNYC and NPR program On the Media (OTM). He had a recurring segment on OTM called "Mike's Shoes", in which he would "disgorge little bits of media fluff" he encountered. In late 2005, he became the first NPR reporter to have his own podcast, On Gambling with Mike Pesca on which he discussed topics related to gambling. He served as a reporter for NPR and Slate's mid-day show Day to Day, on which he also occasionally filled in as host. Other public radio programs he has guest hosted include The Bryant Park Project, Talk of the Nation, On Point, Wait Wait... Don't Tell Me! and The Brian Lehrer Show.

Since 2014, Pesca has served as host of Slate's daily podcast The Gist. Prior to joining the Slate staff, Pesca served as a National Desk correspondent for National Public Radio (NPR). Pesca's reports have been featured on Morning Edition, All Things Considered and Weekend Edition. He covered mainly sports and pop culture for the network, and previously he has covered a wide range of topics including politics, economics, and the arts. He also appears on the WBUR-FM/NPR program Here and Now as well as CNN, PBS NewsHour, and MSNBC. He is a regular contributor to the NPR program Weekend Edition Sunday.

He has also written for Slate and the Washington Post.

In addition to his weekly duties as a panelist on Slate's Hang Up and Listen podcast, Pesca has appeared as a guest on many popular podcasts including NPR's Planet Money, Slate's Culture Gabfest, Luke Burbank's Too Beautiful to Live, The Sporkful and Maximum Fun's Jordan, Jesse, Go!.

In February 2014, Pesca announced that he was leaving NPR to join Slate magazine. In announcing the hiring, Slate podcasts executive producer Andy Bowers called Pesca "one of the most interesting, exciting on-air personalities working today." Pesca has also filled in as host of the NPR radio program Wait, Wait, Don't Tell Me when Peter Sagal was away.

In May 2018, Pesca edited and published Upon Further Review: The Greatest What-Ifs in Sports History, a collection of essays in which authors explore alternative histories in the world of sports. That month, Slate started releasing Upon Further Review, a weekly podcast based on chapters from the book.

In February 2021, Slate indefinitely suspended Pesca after he debated colleagues over whether people who are not Black should be able to quote a racial slur in some contexts. Slate's announcement stated that "this was not a decision based around making an isolated abstract argument". On September 3, 2021, Pesca and Slate "mutually agreed to part ways", and Slate sold The Gist to Pesca, who announced plans to take the show to an independent platform.

The Gist has returned for "Season 2," produced by Peach Fish Productions. It premiered on January 24, 2022.

== Personal life ==
Mike Pesca was born in Oceanside, Long Island, New York. He is of Italian heritage, and his surname is the Italian word for "peach."

In his podcast, The Gist, Pesca has described himself as "the son of a Catholic and a Jew" and as someone who "grew up Catholic, a little bit." Pesca attended Emory University in Atlanta, Georgia, where he was a member of the Alpha Epsilon Pi fraternity and served as vice-president of the school's intra-fraternity council. He graduated from Emory in 1994.

Pesca has two sons (Milo and Emmett) with his ex-wife, Robin Dolch, a public relations executive. He is a fan of the New York Jets, New York Mets, New York Knicks and St. Johns Red Storm. In 2006, Pesca appeared as a contestant on the game show Jeopardy!, where he led going into the Final Jeopardy round, but finished in third place. In 2020, Pesca became engaged to Michelle Hunter with the assistance of Buddy the Rat.

== Awards ==
Pesca is a two-time Edward R. Murrow Award winner. The Murrow awards are presented by the Radio Television Digital News Association (formerly the Radio and Television News Directors Association) for excellence in electronic journalism.

He most recently was awarded the 2010 Murrow for audio sports reporting in the Radio Network/Syndication Service category. He received the award for the season-long weekly series, Friday Night Lives, on "the phenomenon of high school football" which Pesca created with NPR sports correspondent Tom Goldman. The series aired throughout 2009 and 2010 on All Things Considered.

Pesca won the 2001 Murrow Award for Best Radio Feature Reporting for his report "Cracker Jack" that aired on On the Media on August 4, 2001. The feature's premise was that Cracker Jack's inclusion by name in the song Take Me Out to the Ballgame amounts to the "most successful product placement in history".
