= Science fiction podcast =

Genre of media

A Science fiction podcast (sometimes shortened to sci-fi podcast or SF podcast) is a podcast belonging to the science fiction genre, which focuses on futuristic and imaginative advances in science and technology while exploring the impact of these imagined innovations. Characters in these stories often encounter scenarios that involve space exploration, extraterrestrials, time travel, parallel universes, artificial intelligence, robots, and human cloning. Despite the focus on fictional settings and time periods, science fiction podcasts regularly contain or reference locations, events, or people from the real world. The intended audience of a science fiction podcast can vary from young children to adults. Science fiction podcasts developed out of radio dramas. Science fiction podcasts are a subgenre of fiction podcasts and are distinguished from fantasy podcasts and horror podcasts by the absence of magical or macabre themes, respectively, though these subgenres regularly overlap. Science fiction podcasts have often been adapted into television programs, graphic novels, and comics.

== Genre and subgenres ==
Science fiction podcasts often focus on themes such as time travel, space exploration, robots, and artificial intelligence. For instance, science fiction podcasts focused on time travel include Snap Judgement, A Winkle in Time, and Black Box. Examples of science fiction podcast centered on space travel are The Hyacinth Disaster, Wolf 359, Arca-45672, and Voyage to the Stars. An example of a science fiction podcast focused on robots is Electric Easy. SAYER and Chrysalis are two science fiction podcast that focus on Artificial Intelligence. Prominent science fiction podcasts that focus on fictional politics, conspiracy theories, journalism, and crime are Welcome to Night Vale, Andromeda, and Wellspring. The Apocrypha Chronicles and Girl in Space are two science fiction podcasts that explore indigenous futurisms.

=== Science fiction and fantasy podcasts ===
The content of fantasy podcasts often overlaps with science fiction podcasts. These two genres are often grouped together under the label science fiction and fantasy podcasts, which is sometimes shortened to sci-fi/fantasy podcasts or simply SFF. Some examples of podcasts that cover both science fiction and fantasy topics include Imaginary Worlds, Sword & Laser, SFF Yeah!, and The SFF Audio Podcast. Two of the longest running science fiction and fantasy podcasts, as of 2021, are Sword and Laser and the Clarkesworld Magazine podcast, which have both been regularly releasing episodes since 2008.

=== Sci-fi thriller podcasts ===
Science fiction podcasts are typically distinguished from horror podcasts by the absence of macabre or thriller themes, however, the genres often overlap. For instance, sci-fi thrillers like Immunities, Cipher, Forest 404 have very similar themes to horror podcasts.

=== News and reviews ===
Science fiction podcasts that focus on news and reviews of science fiction media include SFF Yeah!, Hugos There, 372 Pages We’ll never Get Back, Flash Forward, Spectology: The Sci-Fi Book Club Podcast, The SFF Audio Podcast, Sword & Laser, Imaginary Worlds, and Newcomers. Other science fiction podcasts focused on discussing, reviewing, and critiquing other works of science fiction are Imaginary Worlds, Eye on Sci-Fi, and Our Opinions Are Correct.

=== Sci-fi improv podcasts ===
Science fiction podcasts that are delivered in an improvised fashion include Mission to Zyxx, Illusionoid, and Stellar Firma.

=== Audio dramas ===
Science fiction podcasts that are delivered in an audio drama format include Marsfall, The Call of the Void The Left Right Game, Wolf 359, Within the Wires, and Red Valley. Others include NULL/VOID, Murmurs, Black Friday, A World Where, Gay Future, The Great Chameleon War, Fun City, Dreambound, Paired, and The Rest Is Electric.

== History ==
Two of the longest running science fiction podcasts, as of 2021, are Sword and Laser and The Clarkesworld Magazine podcast, which have been regularly releasing episodes since 2007 and 2008 respectively. Two of the most notable science fiction podcasts are The Bright Sessions and Welcome to Night Vale. The podcast revolution led to the production of some science fiction podcasts. The intended audience of a science fiction podcast can be a young child like the podcasts Six Minutes, Historynauts, and The Unexplainable Disappearance of Mars Patel. Science fiction podcast producers can be children as well. For instance, The Alien Adventures of Finn Caspian is written by Jonathan Messinger but edited and voiced by his seven year old son Griffin Messinger. Young adults have also produced science fiction podcasts such as Lauren Shippen, who was only twenty-four at the time that she started The Bright Sessions.

Businesses have utilized science fiction podcasts as a method of increasing brand visibility and advertising. For instance, General Electric in partnership with Panoply produced a science fiction podcast entitled The Message, and then later produced a sequel entitled LifeAfter. BMW has also created a science fiction podcast called Hypnopolis. VMware produced a science fiction podcast called I.T. > Sci-Fi. Science fiction podcasts have even been used by museums. For instance, the science fiction podcast called We Are Not Alone was used as an audio tour of the Louvre Abu Dhabi art museum. Audiobook companies that produce fantasy and science fiction audiobooks have often expanded into fantasy and science fiction podcasts. The audiobook publishing company Argon released a science fiction podcast with the title Fantastic stories and where to find them. The audiobook company Tor Labs also produced a science fiction podcast called Steal the Stars. Theatre companies have also used podcasts as an alternative form of employment. Science fiction podcasts have also been included in podcast awards, music awards, and film festivals. For instance the science fiction podcast, Earth Break, premiered at the 2019 Tribeca Film Festival, and a podcast award category was established for the 2021 festival.

The COVID-19 pandemic created an increase in audio productions because film and TV production was difficult to continue under the restrictions put in place as a response to the pandemic. Nonfiction podcasts have been very popular, but fiction podcasts have gained popularity since 2012 after Welcome to Night Vale and Limetown started. For instance, There Be Monsters, From Now, The Oyster, and In Astra were all started during the pandemic. Madeline Wells of SFGate recommended listening to science fiction podcasts during the pandemic.

== Adaptions ==
The science fiction entertainment industry has used podcasts as a medium to test out new ideas for TV and film because it's cheap and easy to produce a podcast. Science fiction podcasts that have been adapted into film and TV series include Limetown, The Left Right Game, Carrier, The Second Oil Age, and The Bright Sessions. There have also been science fiction podcasts entirely based on films such as Doctor Who and The Twilight Zone. While other science fiction podcast such as The Cryptids has been adapted into a video podcasts. Science fiction magazines have been adapted into podcasts and vice versa. For instance, the Escape Pod magazine podcast and the Clarkesworld Magazine podcast. Science fiction podcasts have been adapted into books, comics, and films. For instance, Sword and Laser has been adapted into a book. Voyage to the stars was adapted into a comic series. The Bright Sessions was adapted into young adult novels, the first of which is entitled The Infinite Noise.

== See also ==
- Horror podcast
- Fantasy podcast
- Science fiction
