= List of Solar Opposites episodes =

List of episodes of the animated series Solar Opposites

Solar Opposites is an American adult animated science-fiction sitcom created by Justin Roiland and Mike McMahan for Hulu. The first season premiered on May 8, 2020 and the sixth and final season premiered on October 13, 2025.

During the course of the series, 63 episodes of Solar Opposites were released over six seasons, between May 8, 2020, and October 13, 2025.

== Series overview ==
Season	Episodes	Originally released
1	8	May 8, 2020
2	8	March 26, 2021
2	Special	November 22, 2021
3	11	July 13, 2022
3	Special	October 3, 2022
4	11	August 14, 2023
4	Special	February 5, 2024
5	11	August 12, 2024
5	Special	October 7, 2024
6	10	October 13, 2025

== Episodes ==
=== Season 1 (2020) ===
No. overall	No. in season	Title	Directed by	Written by	Original release date	Prod. code
1	1	"The Matter Transfer Array"	Kim Arndt	Mike McMahan & Justin Roiland	May 8, 2020	1LBF01
One year after escaping the destruction of their planet, Shlorp, and crashing on Earth, adult aliens Korvo and Terry, their two "replicants" Yumyulack and Jesse, and their "pet" the Pupa adjust to their new lives in the town of Geenadavisville. Korvo is determined to repair their spaceship, but Terry introduces him to the television show Funbucket. Realizing that the titular alien is fictional, they create a real Funbucket, who tires of them and befriends humans Travis and Avery. Forced to attend high school, Yumyulack and Jesse are menaced by their classmates and faculty. They shrink a bully named Lydia, hoping to use her to study human behavior. When she threatens to go to the authorities, they attempt to lobotomize her, and Terry pours soda on her exposed brain, erasing her memory. Korvo and Terry create another mutated Funbucket who accidentally fuses with the first, becoming a monster that terrorizes the city. They shrink Funbucket and prepare to kill him, but Travis and Avery take him instead. As the Shlorpian family has dinner together, it is revealed that the Pupa will one day evolve and destroy Earth to terraform a new Shlorp.
2	2	"The Unstable Grey Hole"	Bob Suarez	Mike McMahan	May 8, 2020	1LBF02
Korvo and Terry place nanobots in the city's water supply to spy on their neighbors. Learning they are not well-liked, Korvo and Terry use the nanobots' information to win over the community and run for president of their homeowner association. The nanobots form a sentient person that runs for president as well, and all three expose embarrassing secrets about their neighbors, who break out in violence. The incumbent president, Ruth, restores order and turns the crowd against Korvo, Terry, and the nanobot person, who escapes from Korvo. Jesse, concerned that Yumyulack is shrinking and capturing too many humans, uses technology to manipulate people who were mean to Yumyulack, hoping to teach him that humans are generally kind. Unconvinced, Yumyulack takes her to a neo-Nazi bar, where they are attacked, forcing his automated suit to kill everyone. Inside the vivarium of shrunken humans in Yumyulack and Jesse's bedroom, a new arrival named Tim is introduced to the horrors of the tiny, savage civilization.
3	3	"The Quantum Ring"	Lucas Gray	Matt McKenna	May 8, 2020	1LBF04
Korvo tries to get the family involved in repairing the spaceship, but they attend a birthday party instead, where he is inspired to become a magician. Using his computer system Aisha, Korvo creates a technologically advanced magic act; he goes viral and prepares for a Las Vegas show, which will culminate in him leaping through a black hole. Korvo ignores his family's warning that jealous magicians plan to kill him; the family saves him from being shot, but he dies when the black hole trick goes awry. The grieving family agrees to repair the ship in Korvo's memory, and he reappears, having faked his death to bring them closer together. Yumyulack adds a woman named Cherie to his shrunken collection. Inside, she is rescued by Tim, who explains the society the captives have built: kept in a system of connected terrariums—"the Wall"—they survive mostly on candy given by Jesse, controlled by the tyrannical Duke. Tim, Cherie, and Pedro try to barter with the Duke for insulin for Pedro's diabetic father Enrique, but the Duke has Pedro killed. Tim and Cherie resolve to bring change to the Wall.
4	4	"The Booster Manifold"	Andy Thom	Josh Bycel	May 8, 2020	1LBF03
Korvo, increasingly frustrated by Terry, vomits a "red Goobler"–a stress-induced creature intent on killing Korvo. They buy a Jet Ski from Trent, who is killed by the Goobler. Hunting the creature inside a Halloween store, they shrink and capture it. At school, Jesse discovers a flower growing on her head, which releases pollen similar to MDMA, making the popular girls enamored with her. Yumyulack accompanies Jesse to a party and discovers his flower, with pollen similar to cocaine, and bonds with the popular boys. The mix of Yumyulack and Jesse's pollen creates an effect similar to PCP or bath salts, turning the party-goers bloodthirsty and deranged. Jesse and Yumyulack inform Terry and Korvo, who explain the flowers are a temporary fungus. Armed with "emergency medical weapons", the family heals the party. Rejected by the popular cliques, Jesse and Yumyulack find themselves heroes to the uncool kids. Terry discovers that the red Goobler has escaped but tells Korvo it is dead, filling Terry with his stress; elsewhere, the Goobler plots to kill Korvo. The Pupa winds up in an exotic animal auction, frees the animals, and returns home, only to be accidentally shipped to Africa.
5	5	"The Lavatic Reactor"	Bob Suarez	Sean O'Connor	May 8, 2020	1LBF06
Threatened with expulsion, Yumyulack and Jesse continue to attend their empty high school after the school year ends. Unaware of the summer break, they believe they are being tested and attempt to teach each other. They realize their mistake and wreak havoc on the school and are bribed with straight As after discovering Principal Cooke and Mrs. Frankie having sex in the cafeteria. Korvo and Terry enroll in a junior college, but Terry shoots Korvo with a raygun that makes him dumber. Korvo joins Terry's hard-partying college experience but accidentally causes the "ice lava" that powers their spaceship to flood the city, freezing everyone in its path. Terry teaches himself to repair the leak, returning the ice lava to the ship; everyone who was frozen disintegrates, and Terry reconstitutes their ashes as infants. The family locks Korvo in the bathroom until his intelligence returns. Inside the Wall, Tim and Cherie lead a rebellion to liberate the Duke's food supply, but Tim refuses to use deadly force. They are betrayed by Enrique, who blames Tim for his son's death. The Duke throws Cherie into the "Boo Hoo Hole" and imprisons Tim.
6	6	"The P.A.T.R.I.C.I.A. Device"	Kim Arndt	Danielle Uhlarik	May 8, 2020	1LBF05
Trying to emulate human males, Korvo and Terry create their own man cave and "P.A.T.R.I.C.I.A.," a robot based on female sitcom characters, programmed to hate the man cave. Korvo and Terry realize the robot fulfills their respective desires for a nagging wife and a nurturing mother and invite her inside the man cave. Torn between her conflicting directives, P.A.T.R.I.C.I.A. transforms into a heavily armed killing machine and destroys every man cave in the neighborhood. Ms. Perez, Jesse's gender studies teacher, assigns the class to challenge a glass ceiling. Jesse confronts several school extracurriculars but is disappointed to learn that they already welcome women. Korvo and Terry lure P.A.T.R.I.C.I.A. to a Dave & Buster's, where Ms. Perez also works, but are unable to stop her rampage. Jesse arrives to ask Ms. Perez about the assignment and confronts P.A.T.R.I.C.I.A., allowing Terry to return the robot to her original state. Unable to bring himself to deactivate her, Korvo buries P.A.T.R.I.C.I.A. in a shipping container in the backyard with an emasculated male robot. Yumyulack has his own Australia-themed adventure.
7	7	"Terry and Korvo Steal a Bear"	Andy Thom	Dominic Dierkes	May 8, 2020	1LBF07
Inside the Wall, Tim—imprisoned and tortured on the Duke's orders—is convinced by his cellmate Jean-Pierre to write letters calling for revolution. They are rescued by Cherie and her fellow rebels and prepare to overthrow the Duke. Tim and Cherie spend a passionate night together, and copies of Tim's letters spread throughout the Wall, drawing people to their cause; Cherie urges Tim to lead them. As the Duke addresses a congregation, his sheriff spots Tim in the crowd and attacks, killing Jean-Pierre. Tim unites the oppressed inhabitants of the Wall in an open rebellion. The Duke floods the lower levels, drowning countless people; a farmer named Steven cannot save his beloved mouse, Molly. The rebels rise through the levels of the Wall, confronting the Duke's enforcers, while Korvo and Terry scuffle with a bear in the background. The sheriff fights off Cherie and prepares to kill Tim but is killed by Steven. Tim reaches the Duke's chamber alone and watches the Duke escape through a hidden hole to the outside. Choosing to take control of the Wall himself, Tim stabs Cherie and throws her out to keep the hole secret. Note: Composer Chris Westlake conducted a full orchestral score for this episode, recorded at the Fox Studio sound stage.
8	8	"Retrace-Your-Step-Alizer"	Lucas Gray	Joe Saunders & Ariel Ladensohn	May 8, 2020	1LBF08
When the Pupa turns orange, Korvo realizes he left important Pupa information in his wallet on Shlorp. He and Terry travel back in time to the day they evacuated Shlorp and knock Korvo's wallet into their spaceship. Returning to the present, they realize the Pupa merely ate something orange, but the time stream has been altered, and they now live with Vanbo, an obnoxious Shlorpian. Returning to the past to set things right, Korvo and Terry learn they did not want each other as evacuation partners but reconcile and beat up Vanbo. Yumyulack discovers Jesse has simulated a nicer version of himself in the "Pretend-O-Deck." His simulated self teaches him to be a better brother to Jesse, but one Yumyulack kills the other. Believing he is the rogue simulation, Jesse kills the real Yumyulack. Terry and Korvo return to the dramatically altered present, and Yumyulack enters, revealing the family has been in the Pretend-O-Deck all along. The Pupa telepathically links with a neighbor, Lorraine, and lets her relive memories of her late mother in exchange for retrieving his confiscated Harry Potter whistle. Jesse and Yumyulack ignore the ominous fact that the Pupa has turned purple.

=== Season 2 (2021) ===
No. overall	No. in season	Title	Directed by	Written by	Original release date	Prod. code
9	1	"The Sacred Non-Repeating Number"	Lucas Gray	Mike McMahan	March 26, 2021	2LBF01
The family (now dubbed the Solar Opposites by Terry) finally repair their ship. Only Korvo is glad to leave, so when the ship breaks down because Terry had packed too many useless things, the rest of the family is happy about being stuck on Earth again. The Solar Opposites discover other Schlorpians in London. Terry and Jesse are disheartened by the new aliens, who live underground and hide from humans, but Korvo decides to join them, enjoying their rigid adherence to Schlorpian custom. However, he feels under them when he forgets the holy number, and the new aliens ask him to handle menial tasks like Korvo once did to Terry. Back in the U.S., Jesse and Terry ruin the house in Korvo's absence, with Jesse adopting a high-maintenance elderly dog. Yumyulack hopes to throw a house party, but is tricked into hosting a sleepover by the popular kids as a ruse to throw a house party elsewhere. Embarrassed, he plans to kill the bullies when a new kid named Daryl shows up and they become fast friends. Korvo is asked by the new alien family to steal the Pupa, revealing that they were part of the Schlorpian elite, left a month prior to the planet's destruction, and wish to return to their high status as soon as possible. When Jesse and Terry realize their mistakes and ask Korvo to come home, he agrees, prompting the other aliens to trap him. He escapes and uses the London Eye to return to America, convincing the aliens that the dog is the Pupa to get them to leave Earth.
10	2	"The Earth Eraser"	Kim Arndt	Danielle Uhlarik	March 26, 2021	2LBF02
While out with Jesse, Yumyulack shrinks an obnoxious patron and is surprised that Jesse is not concerned. Terry and Jesse are invited to a dinner party, but Korvo convinces them to let the whole family come. The man Yumyulack shrunk down discovers that since the apparent "death" of the Duke and the rise of Tim, the Wall has become a perfect utopia. At the dinner party, Korvo leaves embarrassed after everyone begins to think he is weird. An angry Korvo successfully declares dinner parties illegal. He and Yumyulack form a new police agency and begin arresting people hosting illegal dinner parties, but Terry continues to have secret dinner parties. In the Wall, a war hero and former Bones writer named Halk investigates a murder, but he is troubled by post-traumatic stress disorder after witnessing the Nerds avalanche in the battle with the Duke. Obsessed with using excessive force, Yumyulack creates deadly hounds that turn people at dinner parties into bottles of wine, but when they set their sights on Terry, Korvo realizes he must save them. The two survive by pretending to be at a birthday party and overturn the law. Yumyulack transforms all the wine back into people. Residents in the Wall grow concerned that the man who recently entered the Wall has not checked into work; unbeknownst to all, he has been gorily killed in his own house.
11	3	"The Lake House Device"	Bob Suarez	Josh Bycel	March 26, 2021	2LBF03
After realizing his warranty complaint box can send other letters into the past (similar to the plot of The Lake House), Korvo uses it to send letters to Terry in order to change his behavior to make him more receptive to Korvo's work requests. Still tortured by the popular kids at school, Yumyulack ignores Jesse's suggestion to get swole and beat them up, instead attempting to procure poisonous snakes. Only able to obtain rabid platypuses, he goes to a gym to follow through with Jesse's suggestion, but is informed by the muscle-bound members that he instead should seek "big dick energy" like that of Pete Davidson. Yumyulack creates his own BDE and is instantly revered. Idris Elba warns Yumyulack that he treads a dangerous path by toying with BDE, prompting Yumyulack to create an even greater one that destroys Rockefeller Center while he hosts Saturday Night Live. Yumyulack is saved by Sigourney Weaver, who tells Yumyulack to replace his BDE with "No Fucks Given" energy instead. At home, Korvo's letters turn Terry into a psychopathic murderer who hunts and kills Korvo, then Yumyulack and Jesse when they return. Leaving his life with the Solar Opposites behind, he meets a blind woman in a park and falls in love with her (in an Up-style montage). Many years later, an elderly Terry sends a letter back to Korvo with instructions to prevent his death, helping Korvo escape Terry and send another letter back to prevent Terry's behavior from changing at all.
12	4	"The Emergency Urbanizer"	Annisa Adjani	Daniel Libman & Matthew Libman	March 26, 2021	2LBF04
Facing a summer of three months at home with Yumyulack and Jesse while school is out, Terry and Korvo are told by another parent to send the replicants to camp (rather than follow Korvo's suggestion to poison them). While dropping them off at camp, the whole family gets lost in the woods. Two months after getting lost, Korvo and Yumyulack decide to use the "emergency urbanizer," which causes a massive city made of trees to sprout from the forest. There, the family split their separate ways to earn enough money to find where they parked the car. Korvo becomes a Goodfellas-esque mafia member, but is continually hunted by wolves; Terry dreams of being an actor, but ends up as a rough-and-tumble prostitute; Yumyulack follows his dream of becoming a sleazy stock market trader, but his firm is raided by the government and his wife leaves him (similar to the plot of The Wolf of Wall Street); and Jesse becomes an iconic fashion designer, but is left emotionally empty by her career. The family reconnects at Jesse's lifetime achievement award party as a fire consumes the city, finally allowing them to find their car and escape. In the Wall (now closely watched over by the Pupa), Halk and the two officers assisting him get closer to finding the killer, who has now murdered and mutilated five victims. While tracking a lead to a seedy sector in the Wall, the two officers kill a man and assume they have caught their suspect, but Halk believes the killer is still out there. Visiting the site of the upcoming Cherie Day celebrations, he fights with a mysterious man carrying a duffle bag revealed to have another murder victim inside. At home, Korvo and Terry learn the forest city survived the fire. They buy a quiet apartment to escape to, only to be attacked by a moose.
13	5	"The Rad Awesome Terrific Ray"	Lucas Gray	Garrick Bernard	March 26, 2021	2LBF05
At a department store, Korvo is shocked to see the red goobler and believes he has returned to kill him. However, the red goobler informs Korvo that he has found love with a woman named Jen and seeks to make amends with him. Jesse and Yumyulack are harangued by the principal for their slow times in the mile, so they cheat with Schlorpian tech and run it in incredible times, causing the principal to sign them up for the national competition in Hawaii. Jen visits Terry and Korvo to invite them to the wedding, but Korvo declares Jen too "basic" to keep the red goobler happy and stay off his mission to kill Korvo. When an irate Jen begins to attack him, Korvo asks Terry to grab the Rad Awesome Terrific (labeled R.A.T.) ray, but he instead grabs the Rat ray, turning Jen into a rat. She escapes, leaving the two in a bind. Terry begins searching for the correct rat while Korvo accompanies the red goobler on his bachelor party, where the two have an impulsive sexual encounter. At nationals, Yumyulack and Jesse again post record times; seemingly about to be investigated for cheating, they are instead asked to join the U.S. team and become celebrities, much to their exhaustion. Instead, they use more Schlorpian tech to try and learn a life lesson from their cheating, but end up learning mostly clichés. Terry is unable to find the rat Jen before the wedding, causing the red goobler to revert to his old behavior and escape, much to Korvo's chagrin. In the sewer, the escaped Jen finds love with a rat.
14	6	"The Apple Pencil Pro"	Kim Arndt	Ariel Ladensohn	March 26, 2021	2LBF06
At an Apple Store, the Solar Opposites encounter a pig monstrosity Genius Bar employee, Peter, that accuses them of torturing him, sending the family to jail. Though none of them can remember him, the family's attorney tells them that an annoyed Korvo created the pig, Peter, during a ribfest block party so Peter could make the best ribs and fixings. Korvo and the family subsequently kept him imprisoned in the basement, repeatedly winning rib contests, until Peter escaped while the family was distracted by Terry driving donuts on the front lawn. Assuming they are being framed, they narrow their list to three possible suspects who Korvo, Terry, and Yumyulack had each wronged. After escaping with the help of the Pupa, they find ribfest ribbons and trophies in their home and are convinced that they did in fact create Peter. In court, they accept the punishment of death for Peter's torture, until he suggests a more painful method: subjecting them to gloves full of bullet ants. While the family is being tortured, the truth is revealed—the three suspects, led by the teacher Yumyulack gave Wolverine-style metal bones to, in fact orchestrated the creation and torture of Peter to get their revenge at the Solar Opposites for what they did to them. Inside the Wall, Halk catches the murderer, who reveals that there is a hole in the wall that Tim knows about. Tim persuades Halk to work with him, and the latter announces that it was a cricket killing people.
15	7	"The Unlikely Demise of Terry's Favorite Shot Glass"	Bob Suarez	Joe Saunders	March 26, 2021	2LBF07
After being stabbed by Tim and thrown out of the Wall, Cherie wakes up with a broken leg in the Solar Opposites' backyard. She is able to survive long enough to find food. While devouring a giant chicken leg, she finds the Duke also feeding there. Despite their initial conflict, they share pieces of their story and realize that Tim was the villain all along. They begin working together to survive in a toy spaceship and growing close, all while living in fear of Jeff, a possum and the mother of a baby that the Duke injured in self-defense. After suspicions that Cherie is pregnant, the Duke tests it with candy and reveals the truth, that Cherie and Tim will have a baby. He points Cherie in the direction of a Walgreens, but sacrifices himself in order to explode Jeff, causing Terry to drop and break a shot glass when Jeff's remains splatter on the window. The Duke also reveals that his name is Ringo. After giving birth at the bottom of a pez container that Jesse is rapidly eating, Cherie reaches the Walgreens that turns out to just be marketing billboard. She then resolves to return to the Wall with her baby and named her Pezlie. Cherie makes it back to the wall and plots with Halk to take down Tim.
16	8	"The Solar Opposites Almost Get an Xbox"	Annisa Adjani	Josh Bycel & Jen McCartney	March 26, 2021	2LBF08
After a party, the Solar Opposites discover that the Pupa has changed color again, and that his light blue finish now means they will all die at midnight, the Pupa will eat them, and finally terraform the planet. They are excited, but while getting his shovel back from a neighbor to dig his own grave, he learns that death is final and there are no do-overs. They think they are fulfilled, but Aisha warns them otherwise. They come up with a lot of ideas of things that will make them happy, but choose only one: travel to Brazil to help a rag-tag water-polo team win a championship. They coach a team and win, but do not feel fulfilled and go fulfilling on their own, but each fail. The Pupa prepares to eat them. They regroup, but only Terry is truly fulfilled, until a fight breaks out and he dies. The others try to kill each other to get fulfilled. After Yumyulack's death, Jesse and Korvo realize that spending time with the people they love is fulfilling just as Korvo dies. Jesse is regretful as she waits to die, however the family is reborn as trees. They hate on their neighbor and all get fulfilled. Hulu reveals a holiday special coming next season.
Christmas special
17	—	"A Very Solar Holiday Opposites Special"	Lucas Gray	Mike McMahan	November 22, 2021	2LBF09
HO HO HO! The Solars don't understand the holidays, but that won't stop them from trying!

=== Season 3 (2022) ===
No. overall	No. in season	Title	Directed by	Written by	Original release date	Prod. code
18	1	"The Extremity Triangulator"	Lucas Gray	Dominic Dierkes	July 13, 2022	3LBF01
The Solar Opposites have repaired their ship again and are finally heading to space.
19	2	"Edamame Duffle Bag"	Teddy O'Connor	Danielle Uhlarik	July 13, 2022	3LBF02
Korvo, celebrating his newfound relaxation, decides to take up a hobby. He is repeatedly annoyed when Terry is sharing the same hobby; he eventually discovers that Terry was trying to share his hobbies. At home, Yumyulack and Jesse climb inside the Pupa to decongest him and bond as they discover he has consumed things from around their house.
20	3	"The Pupa's Big Day"	Kim Arndt	Jen McCartney	July 13, 2022	3LBF03
While standing in line for a new phone and sneaker release, Korvo becomes bored and wants to leave, but Terry insists that he wants to stay in line, as the act of standing in line is his hobby. He reveals that he has made new friends from standing in line, including one friend, Linus, who is jealous of Terry and Korvo's relationship. Jesse becomes infatuated with a man in front of her based on how the back of his head looks, but after fantasizing about him learns he is not as attractive as she hoped. Yumyulack joins what he thinks is a different line, but is actually an obstacle course. The pupa walks away and begins growing; they seem him fighting against a kaiju in another part of the city. Korvo ultimately defeats Linus, who he had kicked out to another line.
21	4	"Hululand"	Bob Suarez	Joe Saunders	July 13, 2022	3LBF04
The Solar Opposites leave for Hululand. In the wall, Halk secretly meets with Cherie. They encounter Tim, who has been poisoned by lead from his Burger King cup. They take him to a hospital, where he hallucinates that he and Cherie escape the wall while the Solar Opposites are gone and enlarge themselves to their original sizes. They escape the house, but return to trap the Solar Opposites in the wall and free everyone else. Back in the hospital, Tim dies.
22	5	"The Gargoyle Ray"	Lucas Gray	Josh Bycel	July 13, 2022	3LBF05
After Terry painted the ceiling, Korvo attempts to turn the rest of the Solar Opposites into gargoyles to give him some alone time. His gun misfires into a neighbor's house, and the police are called. Assuming that Terry and Korvo are the children in the family, they are taken away by Child Protective Services. Korvo ends up on a bus in the tunnel used to film the movie Daylight when the bus breaks down and the tunnel begins collapsing. Sylvester Stallone, who starred in the movie, is also on the bus, and helps rescue Korvo and the other passengers. Terry is believed to have special abilities and is set to be studied by the US government, but he is rescued by a scientist who is surprised to find that Terry is an adult. Yumyulack and Jesse enter the mind of their school principal and realize that he is repressing anger over being forced to be a principal despite loving playing trumpet. They get him to embrace trumpet playing, and escape from his mind.
23	6	"99 Ships"	Teddy O'Connor	Mike McMahan	July 13, 2022	3LBF06
Korvo begins to panic about not completing the mission yet and asks AISHA to tell them what happened to the other 99 ships, which is possible due to all AISHAs running on the same IOS. She tells the story of each team in the style of the Princess Bride and reveals that all of the other teams were killed, except for team one. As they watch team one's pupa successfully terraform their planet, they discover that team one's planet was actually the Shlorp the Solar Opposites came from. There have actually been thousands of Schlorps that were all destroyed by asteroids, and the Shlorpians are a parasitic race that continually takes over planets. The final scene reveals that the Solar Opposites are their Shlorp's 'team one'.
24	7	"The Platinum Beyblade Burst 800 Takara Tomy Edition"	Kim Arndt	Grace Parra Janney	July 13, 2022	3LBF07
Yumyulack learns about high school betting.
25	8	"The Cubic Lattice Crystallizer"	Bob Suarez	Dominic Dierkes	July 13, 2022	3LBF08
The Solar Opposites go on vacation.
26	9	"The Rays That Turn People Into Various Things"	Marisa Livingston	Danielle Uhlarik	July 13, 2022	3LBF09
The Solars are in an award-winning town.
27	10	"Terry and Korvo Get in a Big Screaming Fight in the Taco Bell Parking Lot"	Teddy O'Connor	Garrick Bernard	July 13, 2022	3LBF10
The Solars assume the position and prepare for justice.
28	11	"The Fog of Pupa"	Kim Arndt	Josh Bycel & Vidhya Iyer	July 13, 2022	3LBF11
The Solars wish the Pupa would behave himself.
Halloween special
29	—	"A Sinister Halloween Scary Opposites Solar Special"	Bob Suarez	May Darmon	October 3, 2022	3LBF12
The Solar Opposites are getting scary!

=== Season 4 (2023–24) ===
No. overall	No. in season	Title	Directed by	Written by	Original release date	Prod. code
30	1	"The Ping Pong Table"	Kim Arndt	Dominic Dierkes	August 14, 2023	4LBF01
Korvo and Terry soon get bored at their new job, so to liven things up, they ask their boss to include a ping-pong table and when he caves, they accidentally kill him. Yumyulack and Jesse are pitted against each other by their respective social circles, which culminates in a showdown at the school dance.
31	2	"The Earth Rake"	Bob Suarez	Danielle Uhlarik	August 14, 2023	4LBF02
Believing that Terry's immaturity will mess up a business proposition to a potential client in Wooden City (a city populated by forest-esque creatures), Korvo hijacks the meeting to make things serious. A grounded Yumyulack and Jesse sneak into Wooden City in order to attend a concert, but end up competing with various ne'er-do-wells in order to get passes.
32	3	"The Mobile Aisha Emitter"	Marisa Livingston	Josh Bycel	August 14, 2023	4LBF03
AISHA takes a vacation to meet a guy she has been dating online, but she ends up getting more than she bargained for when he soon reveals that he lied about himself to cover-up a sad secret. Meanwhile, in the Wall, a guy named Garth ends up discovering that the place will freeze up in a short amount of months and his attempts to warn the higher-ups result in a conspiracy revelation.
33	4	"The Pronunciation Cassette Tapes"	Teddy O'Connor	Joe Saunders	August 14, 2023	4LBF04
Wanting a pet, the Solar Opposites decide to create a cartoon-based dinosaur, much to Jesse's frustration since their antics distract her from studying for an upcoming pronunciation bee. Soon though, the aliens end up discovering that the dinosaur has some sinister plans for them.
34	5	"The Birth-A-Day Present"	Bob Suarez	Dominic Dierkes	August 14, 2023	4LBF06
Korvo, Terry and Jesse band together to prevent Yumyulack from discovering his Birth-A-Day present, which by tradition of their alien species, has them gain unstoppable powers that they use to take revenge against those who wronged them. Against AISHA's wants, the Pupa decides to save some random people who got trapped in the space ship when it is about to have a radioactive meltdown.
35	6	"The Stockiverse Ray"	Annisa Adjani	Jen McCartney	August 14, 2023	4LBF05
The Solar Opposites end up getting trapped in another universe filled with stock photos and go through Hell-and-High-Water trying to escape. Some people in the Wall, one of them being Cherie, learn about the upcoming freeze and band together to take back Cherie's infant daughter, Pezlie, that their leader, Sister Sisto, uses to manipulate the populace on her side of the Wall.
36	7	"The Cardboard Dead Drop"	Marisa Livingston	Grace Parra Janney	August 14, 2023	4LBF07
It's an all-out survival-of-the-fittest adventure as Cherie decides to escape Sister Sisto and by extension, the Wall.
37	8	"The Super Gooblers"	Teddy O'Connor	Vidhya Iyer	August 14, 2023	4LBF08
The Solar Opposites find out that they have been creating Super Gooblers due to their various emotional issues and they take a road trip to dump them at a Zoo, but Korvo begins to notice something wrong with Jesse's Super Goobler. The Pupa takes it upon himself to harass a snobby rich woman.
38	9	"Down and Out on Planet X-Non"	Annisa Adjani	Mike McMahan	August 14, 2023	4LBF09
Glen ends up on a planet where he joins a group of rogues to take down the Silvercops.
39	10	"The Re-Visibility Bouillabaisse"	Bob Suarez	May Darmon	August 14, 2023	4LBF10
Korvo and Terry accidentally turn themselves invisible and they are consequently blinded since the sun no longer reflects their eyes and this all results in Korvo befriending a well-known chef that Terry has invited over.
40	11	"The Unwanted Personification of Terry"	Marisa Livingston	Joe Saunders	August 14, 2023	4LBF11
The Solar Opposites realize that they are becoming human and to make matters worse, they find out that Terry sold off the ship (which has been operational for a large sum of time) in order to embrace Earth as their home, but Korvo, wanting to get off Earth, drags his family through a 6-month journey to find the ship lest they end up being human permanently.
Valentine's special
41	—	"An Earth Shatteringly Romantic Solar Valentine's Day Opposites Special"	Teddy O'Connor	Scott Gallopo	February 5, 2024	4LBF12
The Solar Opposites declare war on Valentine's Day by eliminating love from Earth.

=== Season 5 (2024) ===
No. overall	No. in season	Title	Directed by	Written by	Original release date	Prod. code
42	1	"The Clervixian Dinner Helmets"	Teddy O'Connor	Joe Saunders	August 12, 2024	5LBF01
The Solar Opposites attempt to make a home on a Clervix 4 after vacating Earth. At first, they think it is a perfect planet that does not encourage anything "extra," but eventually learn it is being mind controlled by as single entity. They manage to escape, and decide to return to Earth. As they fly back, J.K. Sevens, a friendly robot from Clervix 4, accompanies them.
43	2	"The Never-Ending Honeymoon Story"	Annisa Adjani	Danielle Uhlarik	August 12, 2024	5LBF02
After going back to Earth, Korvo and Terry decide to take a honeymoon but use some cryptic alien tech to mess with Earth's time rotation so that it will be endless.
44	3	"Live Die Repeat Device (Formerly Known as the Edge of Tomorrow Device)"	Daniel Cole	Dominic Dierkes	August 12, 2024	5LBF03
Terry bails on time-loop escapade with Korvo and befriends a human named Jerry. Some escapees from the Wall make a society in the backyard, with one of them, Oscar, growing to trust a stranger named Gavin to make a delivery.
45	4	"The Educational Sprinkler Device"	Marisa Livingston	Grace Parra Janney	August 12, 2024	5LBF04
After getting dissed by a wealthy couple, Korvo and Terry open a private pre-school. Glen befriends a fellow alien who is also training in the Silvercops.
46	5	"Ex-Boyfriend Island"	Teddy O'Connor	Jen McCartney	August 12, 2024	5LBF05
The Solar Opposites go on a vacation separately on a mysterious island full of teenage boys that Jesse created. Gavin ends up having to bring Oscar's niece Sofia on his journey across the backyard and they come across a cult who lives in the sandbox.
47	6	"The Sci-Fi Rollerblades"	Annisa Adjani	May Darmon	August 12, 2024	5LBF06
Korvo gets into it with a bully's father. Terry goes on a journey to make the Pupa drop a ball.
48	7	"The Solar Opposites Do An Intervention"	Daniel Cole	Scott Gallopo	August 12, 2024	5LBF07
The Pupa and their robot companion J.K. Sevens (who has been living with them since the start of the season) must band together to recapture a destructive creature that the Solar Opposites captured while they do an intervention. Gavin and Sofia attempt to lose a bounty hunter called Little Richie.
49	8	"The What If?! Device"	Marisa Livingston	Dash Turner	August 12, 2024	5LBF08
The Solar Opposites desire to mess with a machine that shows what reality would be like if they made different choices leads to them discovering that they had another, more competent member of their crew.
50	9	"The Battle of Zab 9"	Teddy O'Connor	Joe Saunders	August 12, 2024	5LBF09
Glen ends up seeing the dark side of the Silvercops when he and his friend end up on a war planet. Yumyulack and Jesse are once again stuck in babysitter duty when J.K. ends up malfunctioning due to prolonged deviation from his function of killing things.
51	10	"Terry's Big Cleaning Day"	Annisa Adjani	Dominic Dierkes	August 12, 2024	5LBF10
The shrunken people in the backyard end up in one big battle with each other when Sofia and Gavin attempt to expose the inner corruption.
52	11	"Yumyulack's Giant Head"	Daniel Cole	Josh Bycel & Jessica Dollin	August 12, 2024	5LBF11
Yumyulack learns that he is a constant source of food for the Pupa and is constantly regenerated and has his memory of being killed erased every time, leading to a chain of events that has the Solar Opposites face off against a remaining clone of Yumyulack in Ireland.
Halloween special
53	—	"The Solar Opposites Halloween Special Part 2: The Hunt for Brown October"	Marisa Livingston	Sean O'Connor	October 7, 2024	5LBF12
The Solar Opposites do a sequel to their first Halloween special.

=== Season 6 (2025) ===
No. overall	No. in season	Title	Directed by	Written by	Original release date	Prod. code
54	1	"The Unfortunate Destruction of the Diamond-Making Machine"	Teddy O'Connor	Dominic Dierkes	October 13, 2025	6LBF01
The Solar Opposites have been getting idle as of late, resulting in their bodies growing parasites called Beta Nuts and they soon find out that their former commander, Zarck, is living nearby.
55	2	"The Eternal Sleep Sack"	Daniel Cole	Joe Saunders	October 13, 2025	6LBF02
Due to AISHA destroying devices that distribute finances, the Solar Opposites have an estate sale at the cost of Korvo temporarily dying, but a malfunction in a scientific sleeping bag sends him to a limbo-like plane of existence and his family accidentally sell his body. Meanwhile, in the Wall, the new ruler decides to set up a statue of events to cease any usurping attempts, but gets an unexpected surprise.
56	3	"The Sci-Fi Slingshot"	Marisa Livingston	Grace Parra Janney	October 13, 2025	6LBF03
When the pupa unleashes toxic radiation, Korvo and Terry decide to sell their condo in the wooden city due to being short on cash to afford get rid of the toxic, but the keep getting distracted by their horny instincts which are instilled by some exotic flowers. Meanwhile, Yumyulack and Jesse try to get their former principal and teacher back together to avoid taking a quiz.
57	4	"The Paternal Oil"	Teddy O'Connor	May Darmon	October 13, 2025	6LBF04
Korvo and Jesse butt heads over who is the more father-like of the family. Meanwhile, the people in the Wall instigate their plan to get Yumyulack's shrink ray to finally grow big again by issuing an aerial force.
58	5	"The Family Memories VHS Mix Tape"	Daniel Cole	Dash Turner	October 13, 2025	6LBF05
When the Solar Opposites have a family fight, the Pupa and J.K. Stevens decide to pass the time by watching old memories on a VHS tape.
59	6	"The Maturity Point Redistribution Device"	Marisa Livingston	Dominic Dierkes	October 13, 2025	6LBF06
Terry's immaturity results in the Solar Opposites to lose their maturity. The Wall people establishes a flight crew to get to the shrink ray.
60	7	"The Realm of Satin and Swords"	Teddy O'Connor	Joe Saunders	October 13, 2025	6LBF07
Terry becomes hooked on Romantasy books and he and Korvo soon go through a real fantasy adventure. Jesse and Yumyulack discover that their principal has turned into a pupa and attempt to undo the damage.
61	8	"The Last Flight of Ariana 1"	Marisa Livingston	Josh Bycel	October 13, 2025	6LBF08
The Wall people go through hell and high water to get to the shrink ray. When they find out that Pezlie will die if she is unshrunken, they decide to stay small.
62	9	"The Goocleus and the Protoshlorpian"	Lilit Ghazarian	Grace Parra Janney	October 13, 2025	6LBF09
Terry's new author job faces competition from another romantic-fantasy novelist. The replicants attempt to get their names in the school parking lot. Korvo seizes an opportunity to finally get the pupa to terraform.
63	10	"What Is the Mission Anyway?"	Teddy O'Connor	Mike McMahan and Jessica Dollin	October 13, 2025	6LBF10
The pupa begins turning into dangerous creatures. The Silvercops track the Solar Opposites down to arrest them from abandoning their mission, but there's a mole amongst them.
