= List of children's podcasts =

The following is a list of children's podcasts.

== List ==
Podcast	Year	Subgenre	Recommended Age	Starring, Narrator(s), or Host(s)	Produced by	Ref
What If World	2016–present	Stories		Eric O'Keeffe	Independent	
Adventures of Curiosity Cove	2024 - Present	Stories	4 - 10	Tika Sumpter and Nicholas Muscarella	The Black Effect Podcast Network (iHeartPodcasts)	
Girl Tales	2017–present	Stories			Independent	
Calm Kids Podcast	2017–2020	Stories	8 to 11	Lucie and Charlotte	Kids Listen	
Aaron’s World	2016–2018	Stories		Mike Meraz	Independent	
Wow in the World	2017–present	Educational		Mindy Thomas and Guy Raz	Tinkercast	
Smash Boom Best	2018–present	Educational	All ages	Molly Bloom	Brains On Universe	
Animal Sound Safari	2018–2019	Educational		Lawrence Gunatilaka and Laura Jean McKay	ABC Radio	
Pants on Fire		Educational			Gen Z Media	
Soundwalks	2020–present	Meditation			Timepoint Ensemble	
Bedtime Explorers	2017–2020	Meditation			Kinderling Kids Radio	
Peace Out	2020–present	Meditation		Chanel Tsang	Independent	
Ear Snacks	2015–present	Music		Andrew & Polly	Independent	
Noodle Loaf	2018–present	Music		Dan Saks	Independent	
The Music Box		Music				
Classical Kids Storytime	2018–present	Music			American Public Media	
Spare the Rock, Spoil the Child	2005–present	Music			PRX	
Stories Podcast	2014–present	Stories	All ages	Amanda Weldin and Dan Hinds	Wondery	
Purple Rocket Podcast	2017–present	Stories		Greg Webb	Independent	
Circle Round	2018–present	Stories	Ages 4 to 10	Various voice actors	WBUR	
Story Pirates	2013–present	Stories	Middle-grade kids	Billy Eichner, Lin-Manuel Miranda, Dax Shepard, Bowen Yang, Claire Danes, John Oliver, and Lake Bell	Story Pirates Studios	
Story Seeds	2020–present	Stories	Ages 6 to 12	Betsy Bird	Literary Safari	
Fierce Girls	2018–present	Stories	Age 7	Amy Shark, Yael Stone, Dame Quentin Bryce, Claudia Karvan, Turia Pitt, Stephanie Gilmore, and Leah Purcell	ABC Radio	
Planet Storytime	2019–present	Stories		Thomas Mitchell & Paxton Stanley	Independent	
Brains On	2013–present	Science	All ages	Molly Bloom	Brains On Universe	
Moment of Um		Science	All ages	Molly Bloom	Brains On Universe	
Warrior Kid Podcast	2018–present	Health	Ages 8 and up	Jocko Willink	Jocko DEFCOR Network	
But Why	2016–present	Educational	"Slightly older kids"	Jane Lindholm	Vermont Public Radio	
Live From Mount Olympus	2021–present	Myths		Rachel Chavkin and Zhailon Levingston	Onassis Foundation and TRAX Network from PRX	
Saturday Morning Cereal Bowl	2020–present	Music		Dave Loftin	Independent	
Earth Rangers	2018–present	Educational	"Slightly older kids"		Gen-Z Media	
Molly of Denali	2019–present	Stories			PBS Kids	
Eleanor Amplified	2016–2020	Adventure		Terry Gross	WHYY	
The Story Store		Stories				
Tai Asks Why		Educational				
The Alien Adventures of Finn Caspian		Stories				
Wow in the World		Educational				
Smash Boom Best		Educational				
The Unexplainable Disappearance of Mars Patel		Stories				
Two Whats and a Wow!		Educational				
Radiolab for Kids		Educational				
The Show About Science		Educational				
Chompers		Activities			Gimlet Media	
Best Day Yet		Activities				
Peace Out		Activities				
The Music Box		Music				
Story Pirates		Stories				
Dream Big		Educational				
Sesame Street Podcast		Educational				
Pickle		Educational				
ExtraBLURT		Interactive				
Bedtime Explorers		Stories				
Noodleloaf		Music				
Spare the Rock Spoil the Child		Music				
The Saturday Morning Cereal Bowl		Music				
Ear Snacks		Educational				
The Past & the Curious		Educational				
Book Club for Kids		Educational				
Five Minutes With Dad	2014–present	Educational	2-12	Pavlos Pavlidis, Angela Pavlidis, and Nick Pavlidis	Independent	
Tumble		Science				
Short & Curly		Science				
The Radio Adventures of Dr. Floyd		Stories				
Julie’s Library: Story Time with Julie Andrews		Stories				
Mystery Recipe Podcast		Interactive				
The Big Fib		Interactive				
The Two Princes		Stories	Tweens			
This American Life		Educational	Teens			
KidNuz		Educational				
Story Time		Stories	Preschoolers and little kids			
Be Calm on Ahway Island	2017–present	Stories, Meditation	3 to 10		Sheep Jam Productions	
Flyest Fables			Big kids and tweens			
Welcome to Night Vale			Teens			
Stuff You Should Know			Teens			
All Songs Considered			Teens			
Unspookable	2018–present	Educational	Ages 8 and up	Elise Parisian, Nate DuFort, Ellenor Riley-Condit	Soundsington Media	
Storynory						
Curlee Girlee's Crackin' the Kid Code						
Everything Under The Sun						
Super Great Kids' Stories		Stories				
Home School Hub		Educational				
Brains On!		Science				
The Week Junior Show						
This Podcast Has Fleas	2017	Stories		Jay Pharoah, Emily Lynne, Eugene Mirman, Alec Baldwin	WNYC Studios	
Little Stories for Tiny People	2015–present	Stories	Toddlers and little kids	Rhea Pechter	Independent	
The Past and the Curious						
Six Minutes	2018–present				Gen-Z Media, Wondery, and PRX	
Reach: A Space Podcast for Kids	2020–present	Educational		Brian Holden, Meredith Stepien	Soundsington Media	
David Walliams' Marvellous Musical Podcast	2019	Music	7 to 12	David Walliams	Classic FM	
Once Upon A Crescent: Muslim Kid's Podcast	2020	Stories	4 +	Mrs. Hashimi	Mrs. Hashimi	
Sonic the Hedgehog Presents: The Chaotix Casefiles	2026	Stories		Keith Silverstein, Matthew Mercer, Colleen O'Shaughnessey	Sega of America and Realm	

== See also ==
- List of advice podcasts
- List of fantasy podcasts
- List of pop culture podcasts
