= Lily Brooks O'Briant =

American actress (born 2006)

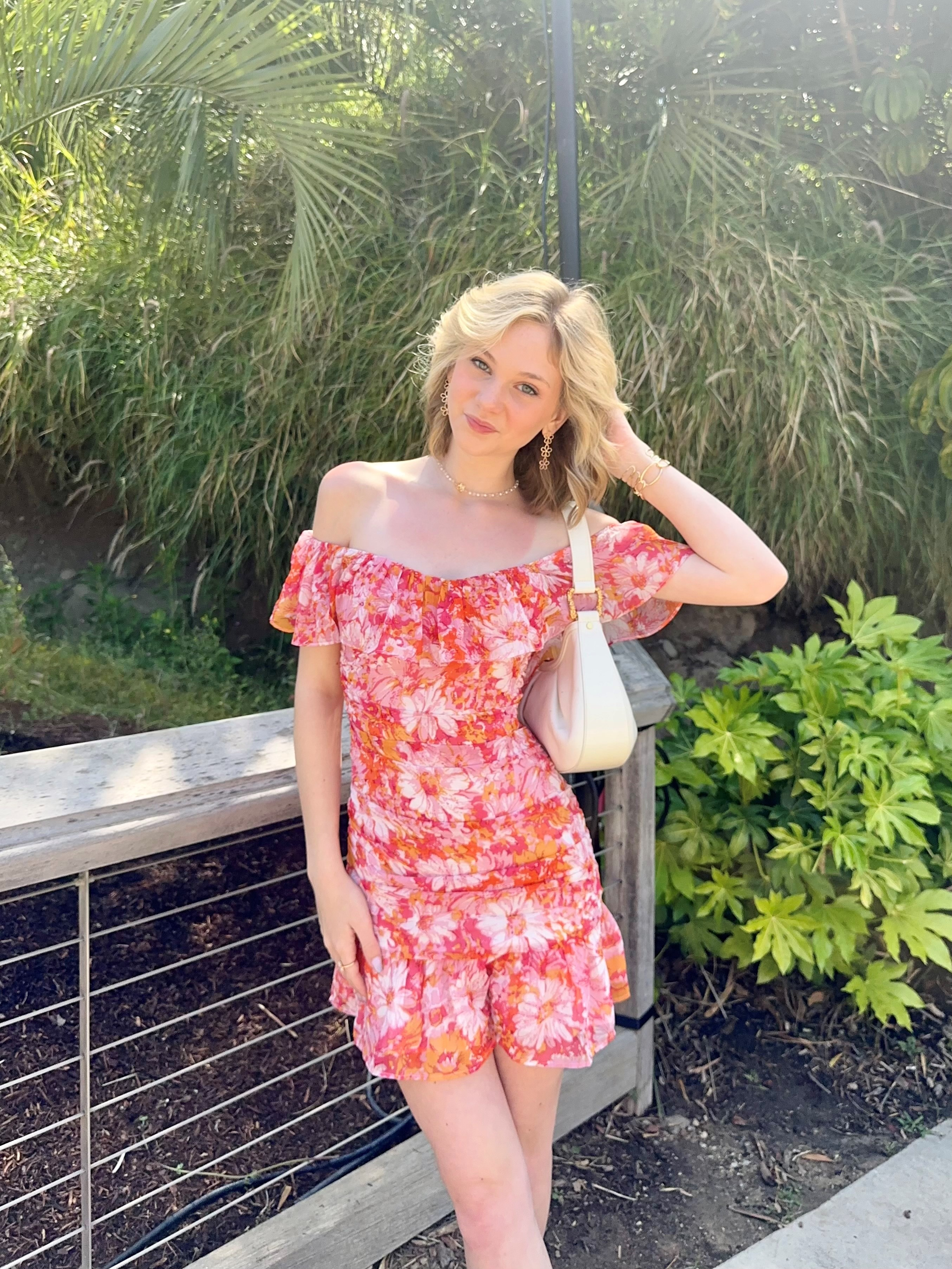
- Born: Lily Brooks O'Briant; July 10, 2006 (age 20); Memphis, Tennessee, U.S.
- Occupation: Actress
- Years active: 2015–present
- Television: The Tick; The Big Show Show; Life By Ella
- Awards: Wasserman Award (Marina & Presentation); New York City Independent Film Festival award (Best Actress - Short film)

Lily Brooks O'Briant (born July 10, 2006) is an American actress and singer best known for playing the lead role of Ella McCaffrey on the Apple TV+ series Life by Ella and the title character in the touring company of the musical Matilda.

== Early life ==
O'Briant was born in Memphis, Tennessee, and traveled the country as part of the Matilda tour throughout 2015 and much of 2016. When she was cast in The Big Show Show in 2019, she relocated to Los Angeles, where she currently resides.

== Acting career ==
O'Briant began her on-screen career aged eight when she appeared in the film Shark Lake alongside Dolph Lundgren. Filming began in January 2015 and was directed by Jerry Dugan with a reported budget of $2 million. She portrayed Carly Gray, the daughter of Clint, a black market dealer played by Lundgren, responsible for releasing a dangerous shark into Lake Tahoe.

During the same year, she was announced as lead in the US tour of the musical Matilda. She held the role of Matilda until mid-2016, playing in various cities across the US.

Following the role of Matilda, O'Briant moved into short films and received credits for a number of productions from 2016 through 2018. This included Marina, in which she played the lead role. The story follows a young girl born with spinal muscular atrophy. In 2018, she won three awards for Marina: a Wasserman Award, a New York City Independent Film Festival Award, and the Five Continents Film Festival. All three awards were in the category for "Best Young Actress", and she was also nominated for a similar award at the Utah Film Awards. She was also honored for the short film Presentation at the Independent Shorts Awards. In 2018, she began voicing in the podcast Six Minutes, where she portrays the role of one of the protagonists, Birdie Anders.

In 2019, O'Briant secured her first major TV role in the Amazon TV series The Tick. During the same year, she became part of the lead cast in The Big Show Show, portraying Mandy Wight, the middle child of WWE superstar Big Show (Paul Wight). The first season debuted April 6, 2020. Later that year, O'Briant recorded remotely for the award-winning musical The Perfect Fit, appearing alongside Laura Benanti and others in Joshua Turchin's production.

In 2021, she landed the lead role on the Apple TV+ original series ''Life By Ella'', premiering on September 2, 2022. The story centers on teenager, Ella McCaffrey, returning to middle school after battling cancer and her new found determination to live a more fearless life.

In January 2023, it was announced O'Briant had joined the cast of The Young and the Restless in the role of Lucy Romalotti.

== Music career ==
On September 9, 2022, she released her first single, Slow, on Apple Music and Spotify.
