= List of accolades received by Us (2019 film) =

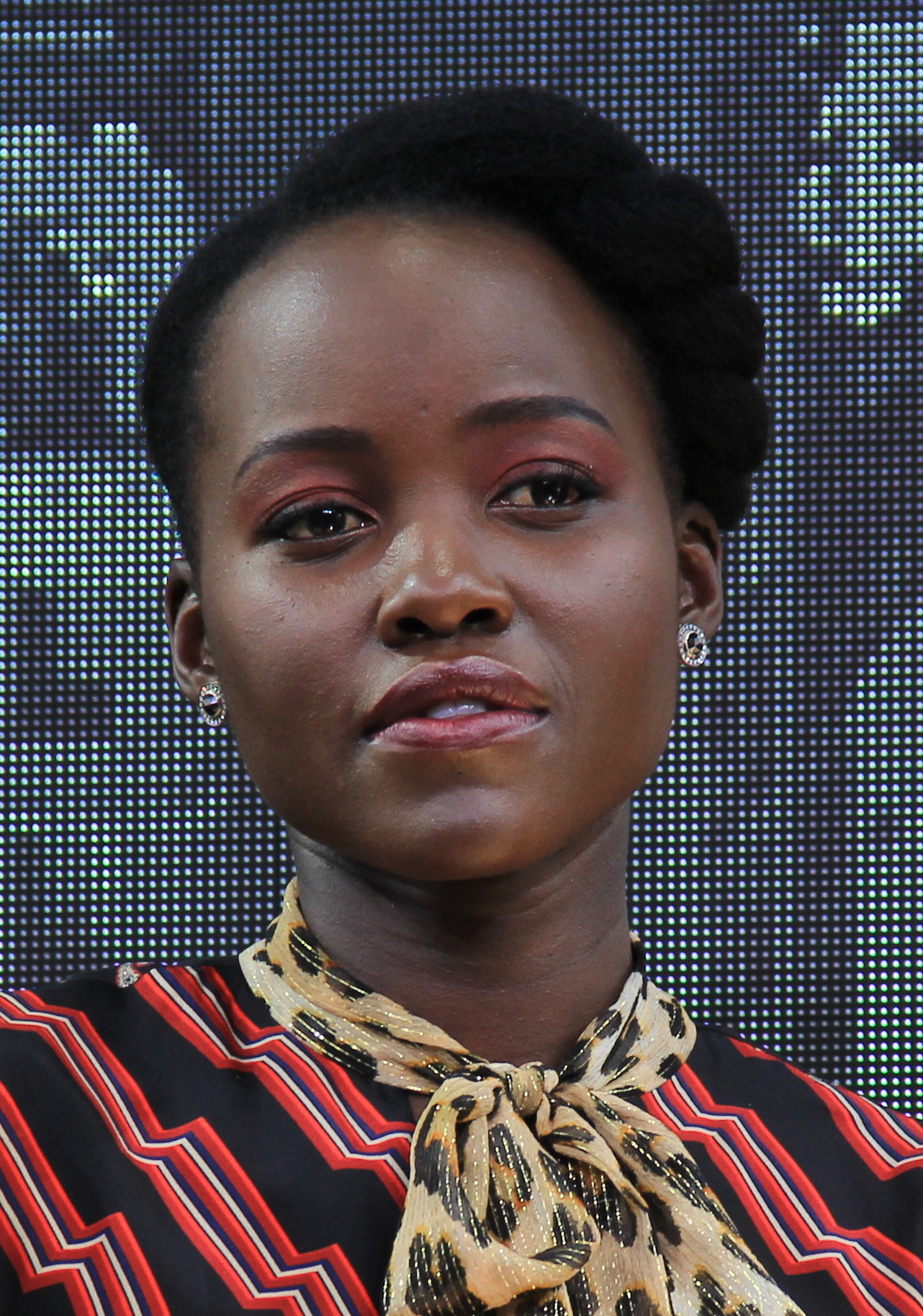
- Lupita Nyong'o received widespread critical acclaim and several award nominations for her dual role performance
Accolades
Award	Wins	Nominations
African-American Film Critics Association	3	0
Alliance of Women Film Journalists	1	2
Art Directors Guild	0	1
Austin Film Critics Association	1	2
Black Reel Awards	4	7
Bram Stoker Award	1	1
Chicago Film Critics Awards	0	2
Critics' Choice Movie Awards	0	4
Dallas–Fort Worth Film Critics Association	0	1
Detroit Film Critics Society	0	1
Dorian Awards	0	1
Dublin Film Critics' Circle	1	2
Georgia Film Critics Association	1	1
Golden Trailer Awards	5	4
Hollywood Critics Association	3	1
Hollywood Music in Media Awards	1	0
Houston Film Critics Society	0	2
ICG Publicists Awards	0	1
International Cinephile Society	0	1
London Film Critics' Circle	0	1
Los Angeles Film Critics Association Awards	1	0
Make-Up Artists and Hair Stylists Guild Awards	0	1
MTV Movie & TV Awards	0	3
NAACP Image Awards	2	6
New York Film Critics Circle Awards	1	0
New York Film Critics Online	1	0
Online Film Critics Society	2	2
People's Choice Awards	0	4
The ReFrame Stamp	1	0
San Diego Film Critics Society	1	0
San Francisco Bay Area Film Critics Circle	1	0
Santa Barbara International Film Festival	1	0
Saturn Awards	1	7
Screen Actors Guild Awards	0	1
Seattle Film Critics Society	1	2
St. Louis Film Critics Association	1	0
Toronto Film Critics Association	1	0
Vancouver Film Critics Circle	1	0
Washington D.C. Area Film Critics Association	2	2
World Soundtrack Awards	1	0

Totals (Note: Certain award groups do not simply award one winner. They acknowledge several different recipients, have runners-up, and have third place. Since this is a specific recognition and is different from losing an award, runner-up mentions are considered wins in this award tally. For simplification and to avoid errors, each award in this list has been presumed to have had a prior nomination.)
- Wins: 40
- Nominations: 63

Us is a 2019 American horror film written and directed by Jordan Peele, starring Lupita Nyong'o, Winston Duke, Shahadi Wright Joseph, Evan Alex, Elisabeth Moss, and Tim Heidecker. The film follows Adelaide Wilson (Nyong'o) and her family, who are attacked by a group of menacing doppelgängers.

The film had its world premiere at South by Southwest on March 8, 2019, and was theatrically released in the United States on March 22, 2019, by Universal Pictures. Us was a commercial success, grossing $255.1 million worldwide against a budget of $20 million and received praise for Nyong'o's dual role performance and Michael Abels' musical score.

Us was nominated for one Art Directors Guild, eleven Black Reel Awards (winning four), four Critics' Choice Movie Awards, nine Golden Trailer Awards (winning five), one Make-Up Artists and Hair Stylists Guild, three MTV Movie & TV Awards, eight NAACP Image Awards (winning two), four People's Choice Awards, seven Saturn Awards (winning one), one Screen Actors Guild Award, and one World Soundtrack Awards (won).

== Accolades ==
Award	Date of ceremony	Category	Recipient(s)	Result
African-American Film Critics Association	December 10, 2019	Best Film	Us	Won
African-American Film Critics Association	December 10, 2019	Best Actress	Lupita Nyong'o	Won
African-American Film Critics Association	December 10, 2019	Best Director	Jordan Peele	Won
Alliance of Women Film Journalists	January 10, 2020	Best Actress	Lupita Nyong'o	Won
Alliance of Women Film Journalists	January 10, 2020	Most Daring Performance Award	Lupita Nyong'o	Nominated
Art Directors Guild Awards	February 1, 2020	Contemporary Film	Ruth De Jong	Nominated
Austin Film Critics Association	January 7, 2020	Best Actress	Lupita Nyong'o	Won
Austin Film Critics Association	January 7, 2020	Best Original Screenplay	Jordan Peele	Nominated
Austin Film Critics Association	January 7, 2020	Best Original Score	Michael Abels	Nominated
Black Reel Awards	February 6, 2020	Outstanding Film	Us	Nominated
Black Reel Awards	February 6, 2020	Outstanding Actress	Lupita Nyong'o	Won
Black Reel Awards	February 6, 2020	Outstanding Director	Jordan Peele	Won
Black Reel Awards	February 6, 2020	Outstanding Supporting Actress	Shahadi Wright Joseph	Nominated
Black Reel Awards	February 6, 2020	Outstanding Breakthrough Performance – Female	Shahadi Wright Joseph	Nominated
Black Reel Awards	February 6, 2020	Outstanding Screenplay	Jordan Peele	Won
Black Reel Awards	February 6, 2020	Outstanding Ensemble	Terri Taylor – casting director	Nominated
Black Reel Awards	February 6, 2020	Outstanding Score	Michael Abels	Won
Black Reel Awards	February 6, 2020	Outstanding Cinematography	Mike Gioulakis	Nominated
Black Reel Awards	February 6, 2020	Outstanding Costume Design	Kym Barrett	Nominated
Black Reel Awards	February 6, 2020	Outstanding Production Design	Ruth De Jong	Nominated
Bram Stoker Award	April 18, 2020	Superior Achievement in a Screenplay	Jordan Peele	Won
Chicago Film Critics Association	December 14, 2019	Best Actress	Lupita Nyong'o	Won
Chicago Film Critics Association	December 14, 2019	Best Score	Michael Abels	Nominated
Critics' Choice Movie Awards	January 12, 2020	Best Sci-Fi/Horror Movie	Us	Won
Critics' Choice Movie Awards	January 12, 2020	Best Actress	Lupita Nyong'o	Nominated
Critics' Choice Movie Awards	January 12, 2020	Best Young Actress	Shahadi Wright Joseph	Nominated
Critics' Choice Movie Awards	January 12, 2020	Best Score	Michael Abels	Nominated
Dallas–Fort Worth Film Critics Association	December 16, 2019	Best Actress	Lupita Nyong'o	5th Place
Detroit Film Critics Society	December 9, 2019	Best Actress	Lupita Nyong'o	Nominated
Dorian Awards	January 8, 2020	Film Performance of the Year - Actress	Lupita Nyong'o	Nominated
Dublin Film Critics' Circle	December 17, 2019	Best Actress	Lupita Nyong'o	Runner-up
Dublin Film Critics' Circle	December 17, 2019	Best Director	Jordan Peele	7th Place
Dublin Film Critics' Circle	December 17, 2019	Best Screenplay	Jordan Peele	9th Place
Georgia Film Critics Association	January 10, 2020	Best Actress	Lupita Nyong'o	Won
Georgia Film Critics Association	January 10, 2020	Best Original Score	Michael Abels	Nominated
Golden Trailer Awards	May 29, 2019	Best Horror	Int'l Trailer "Nightmare," Universal Pictures, Buddha Jones	Won
Golden Trailer Awards	May 29, 2019	Best Thriller	Int'l Trailer "Nightmare," Universal Pictures, Buddha Jones	Nominated
Golden Trailer Awards	May 29, 2019	Best Music	"Enemy," Universal Pictures, Inside Job	Won
Golden Trailer Awards	May 29, 2019	Most Original Trailer	"Enemy," Universal Pictures, Inside Job	Nominated
Golden Trailer Awards	May 29, 2019	Best Motion/Title Graphics	Us, Universal Pictures, Mark Woollen & Associates	Nominated
Golden Trailer Awards	May 29, 2019	Best Sound Editing	Int'l Trailer "Nightmare", Universal, Buddha Jones	Nominated
Golden Trailer Awards	May 29, 2019	Best Horror TV Spot (for a Feature Film)	"Nightmare SuperBowl :60", Universal, Buddha Jones	Won
Golden Trailer Awards	May 29, 2019	Best Horror TV Spot (for a Feature Film)	"Megacation", Universal Pictures, Inside Job	Nominated
Golden Trailer Awards	May 29, 2019	Best Thriller TV Spot (for a Feature Film)	"Nightmare SuperBowl :60", Universal, Buddha Jones	Won
Golden Trailer Awards	May 29, 2019	Most Innovative Advertising for a Feature Film	"11:11", Universal Pictures, Inside Job	Won
Hollywood Critics Association	January 9, 2020	Best Horror	Us	Won
Hollywood Critics Association	January 9, 2020	Best Actress	Lupita Nyong'o	Won
Hollywood Critics Association	January 9, 2020	Next Generation of Hollywood	Shahadi Wright Joseph	Won
Hollywood Critics Association	January 9, 2020	Best Score	Michael Abels	Nominated
Hollywood Music in Media Awards	November 20, 2019	Original Score — Horror Film	Michael Abels	Won
Houston Film Critics Society	January 2, 2020	Best Actress	Lupita Nyong'o	Nominated
Houston Film Critics Society	January 2, 2020	Best Original Score	Michael Abels	Nominated
ICG Publicists Awards	February 7, 2020	Maxwell Weinberg Publicist Showmanship Award	Us	Nominated
International Cinephile Society	February 4, 2020	Best Actress	Lupita Nyong'o	Nominated
London Film Critics' Circle	January 30, 2020	Actress of the Year	Lupita Nyong'o	Nominated
Los Angeles Film Critics Association	December 8, 2019	Best Actress	Lupita Nyong'o	Runner-up
Make-Up Artists and Hair Stylists Guild	January 11, 2020	Best Contemporary Make-Up	Scott Wheeler, Tym Shutchai Buacharern, and Sabrina Castro	Nominated
MTV Movie & TV Awards	June 17, 2019	Best Movie	Us	Nominated
MTV Movie & TV Awards	June 17, 2019	Best Performance in a Movie	Lupita Nyong'o	Nominated
MTV Movie & TV Awards	June 17, 2019	Best Villain	Lupita Nyong'o	Nominated
NAACP Image Awards	February 22, 2020	Outstanding Motion Picture	Us	Nominated
NAACP Image Awards	February 22, 2020	Outstanding Ensemble Cast in a Motion Picture	Us	Nominated
NAACP Image Awards	February 22, 2020	Outstanding Actress in a Motion Picture	Lupita Nyong'o	Won
NAACP Image Awards	February 22, 2020	Outstanding Actor in a Motion Picture	Winston Duke	Nominated
NAACP Image Awards	February 22, 2020	Outstanding Breakthrough Performance in Motion Picture	Shahadi Wright Joseph	Nominated
NAACP Image Awards	February 22, 2020	Outstanding Writing in a Motion Picture	Jordan Peele	Won
NAACP Image Awards	February 22, 2020	Outstanding Directing in a Motion Picture	Jordan Peele	Nominated
NAACP Image Awards	February 22, 2020	Outstanding Soundtrack/Compilation Album	Michael Abels	Nominated
New York Film Critics Circle Awards	December 4, 2019	Best Actress	Lupita Nyong'o	Won
New York Film Critics Online	December 7, 2019	Best Actress	Lupita Nyong'o	Won
Online Film Critics Society	January 6, 2020	Best Movie	Us	7th Place
Online Film Critics Society	January 6, 2020	Best Actress	Lupita Nyong'o	Won
Online Film Critics Society	January 6, 2020	Best Original Screenplay	Jordan Peele	Nominated
Online Film Critics Society	January 6, 2020	Best Score	Michael Abels	Won
People's Choice Awards	November 10, 2019	Movie of the Year	Us	Nominated
People's Choice Awards	November 10, 2019	Drama Movie of the Year	Us	Nominated
People's Choice Awards	November 10, 2019	Drama Movie Star of the Year	Lupita Nyong'o	Nominated
People's Choice Awards	November 10, 2019	Female Movie Star of the Year	Lupita Nyong'o	Nominated
The ReFrame Stamp	February 26, 2020	2019 Top 100-Grossing Narrative Feature Recipients	Us	Won
San Diego Film Critics Society	December 9, 2019	Best Actress	Lupita Nyong'o	Won
San Francisco Bay Area Film Critics Circle	December 16, 2019	Best Actress	Lupita Nyong'o	Won
Santa Barbara International Film Festival	January 20, 2020	Montecito Award	Lupita Nyong'o	Won
Saturn Awards	September 13, 2019	Best Horror Film	Us	Nominated
Saturn Awards	September 13, 2019	Best Actress	Lupita Nyong'o	Nominated
Saturn Awards	September 13, 2019	Best Performance by a Younger Actor	Shahadi Wright Joseph	Nominated
Saturn Awards	September 13, 2019	Best Performance by a Younger Actor	Evan Alex	Nominated
Saturn Awards	September 13, 2019	Best Director	Jordan Peele	Won
Saturn Awards	September 13, 2019	Best Writing	Jordan Peele	Nominated
Saturn Awards	September 13, 2019	Best Production Design	Ruth De Jong	Nominated
Saturn Awards	September 13, 2019	Best Film Editing	Nicholas Monsour	Nominated
Screen Actors Guild Awards	January 19, 2020	Outstanding Performance by a Female Actor in a Leading Role	Lupita Nyong'o	Nominated
Seattle Film Critics Society	December 13, 2019	Best Actress	Lupita Nyong'o	Won
Seattle Film Critics Society	December 13, 2019	Best Score	Michael Abels	Nominated
Seattle Film Critics Society	December 13, 2019	Villain of the Year	Lupita Nyong'o	Nominated
St. Louis Film Critics Association	December 15, 2019	Best Horror Film	Us	Won
Toronto Film Critics Association	December 8, 2019	Best Actress	Lupita Nyong'o	Won
Vancouver Film Critics Circle	December 16, 2019	Best Actress	Lupita Nyong'o	Runner-up
Washington D.C. Area Film Critics Association	December 8, 2019	Best Actress	Lupita Nyong'o	Won
Washington D.C. Area Film Critics Association	December 8, 2019	Best Youth Performance	Shahadi Wright Joseph	Nominated
Washington D.C. Area Film Critics Association	December 8, 2019	Best Score	Michael Abels	Won
Washington D.C. Area Film Critics Association	December 8, 2019	Best Adapted Screenplay	Jordan Peele	Nominated
World Soundtrack Awards	October 18, 2019	Discovery of the Year	Michael Abels	Won
