= The Alien Adventures of Finn Caspian =

Science fiction podcast for children

- Genre: Science fiction podcast; mystery podcast; kids & family podcast; space drama
- Format: Audio podcast
- Language: American English

Creative team
- Written by: Jonathan Messinger
- Creative director: Griffin Messinger

Cast and voices
- Narrated by: Jonathan Messinger; Griffin Messinger

Music
- Opening theme: Theme song by Mayfair Workshop
- Ending theme: "Shiny Spaceship" by 8-Bit Ninja
- Composed by: Mark Greenberg

Production
- Length: 15–20 minutes

Publication
- No. of seasons: 7
- No. of episodes: 191
- Original release: August 1, 2016 – present
- Provider: Typedrawer Media; Gen-Z Media; MiMO Studio
- Updates: Weekly

Related
- Related shows: Eleanor Amplified; Six Minutes; The Unexplainable Disappearance of Mars Patel
- Website: finncaspian.com

The Alien Adventures of Finn Caspian is a serialized science fiction podcast about an 8-year-old and his friends exploring space and solving mysteries together. It is written and produced by Jonathan Messinger.

== Premise ==
The podcast's story follows the adventures of an 8-year-old named Finn Caspian and his three friends Abigail, Elias, and Vale as they explore different planets in the famous Interplanetary Exploratory Space Station called Marlowe 280. Along the way, Caspian and his friends, who are all part of the Explorer Troop 301, encounter mysteries and help aliens.

== Production ==
The podcast is recorded by Jonathan Messinger and his son Griffin in the basement of their home in Portage Park, Chicago. Jonathan Messinger founded a kids podcast company called Typedrawer Media that started out with Finn Caspian. The podcast has also been a part of Gen-Z Media and was later acquired by MiMO Studios.

== Cast and characters ==
- Finn Caspian
- Foggy (Finn caspian's robot)
- Abigail
- Elias
- Vale
- BeeBop

== Episodes ==
No.	Title	Length	Original release date
0	"An Introduction"	2:51	August 1, 2016
1	"The Room Behind the Room (Behind the Room)"	21:11	August 9, 2016
2	"Everybody Run!!!"	29:28	August 16, 2016
3	"Foggy"	25:48	August 24, 2016
4	"Running Out of Patiens"	21:14	August 30, 2016
5	"In the Dwellers' Cellar"	24:53	September 6, 2016
6	"Two Heads Are Better than One"	22:17	September 13, 2016
Bonus–Episode	"Robot Roll Call"	5:12	September 20, 2016
7	"Dream a Little Dreamstone"	23:00	September 21, 2016
8	"Voltronix Who?"	25:06	September 27, 2016
9	"You Call This a Planet?"	27:45	October 4, 2016
10	"In the Belly of the Beast"	25:11	October 11, 2016
11	"Who am I?"	25:25	October 18, 2016
12	"Not You Again!"	26:35	October 25, 2016
Bonus–Episode	"Halloween Special"	12:13	October 31, 2016
13	"The Six Steps"	29:29	November 2, 2016
14	"The Fallen City"	30:04	November 10, 2016
15a	"Mothers Know Best"	22:17	November 15, 2016
15b	"The Battle for the Marlowe"	30:32	November 19, 2016

== Reception ==
Frannie Ucciferri wrote in The Washington Post that the show "is perfect for long car rides." Jen McGuire made a similar comment in Romper saying that the podcast is "perfect for driving around town with the family." Janelle Randazza of Reviewed said the podcast "is perfectly gripping and a great choice". The show won the 2017 Academy of Podcasters award for best kids and family podcast.

== Adaptations ==
In 2020, the podcast was acquired by MiMO studio with the intention to adapt the podcast into animated TV-length movies.

Messinger has also released four books based on the podcast.

- Messinger, Jonathan; Bitskoff, Aleksei (2020). The Alien Adventures of Finn Caspian #1: The Fuzzy Apocalypse. HarperCollins. ISBN 9780062932150.
- Messinger, Jonathan; Bitskoff, Aleksei (2020). The Alien Adventures of Finn Caspian #2: The Accidental Volcano. HarperCollins. ISBN 9780062932181.
- Messinger, Jonathan; Bitskoff, Aleksei (2020). The Alien Adventures of Finn Caspian #3: The Uncommon Cold. HarperCollins. ISBN 9780062932204.
- Messinger, Jonathan; Bitskoff, Aleksei (2020). The Alien Adventures of Finn Caspian #4: Journey to the Center of That Thing. HarperCollins. ISBN 9780062932235.
