= The Big Show Show =

2020 WWE Studios and Netflix television series

- Genre: Sitcom
- Created by: Josh Bycel and Jason Berger
- Starring: Big Show; Allison Munn; Reylynn Caster; Lily Brooks O'Briant; Juliet Donenfeld
- Country of origin: United States
- Original language: English
- No. of seasons: 1
- No. of episodes: 8+ 1 special

Production
- Executive producers: Josh Bycel; Jason Berger; Susan Levison; Richard Lowell
- Producer: Paul Wight
- Camera setup: Multi-camera
- Running time: 25-28 minutes
- Production companies: Z+M Industrial Films; Northrock 6; WWE Studios

Original release
- Network: Netflix
- Release: April 6 – December 9, 2020

The Big Show Show is an American sitcom created by Josh Bycel and Jason Berger. Produced by WWE Studios, it premiered on Netflix with eight episodes on April 6, 2020. The series stars professional wrestling veteran and titular character, the Big Show, with Allison Munn, Reylynn Caster, Lily Brooks O'Briant, and Juliet Donenfeld playing a fictionalized version of his family. The series was canceled after one season, ending with a Christmas special released on December 9, 2020.

== Premise ==
The show features professional wrestler Big Show as a fictional version of himself. The premise features his teenage daughter from his first wife moving in with him, his second wife, and two younger daughters.

== Cast and characters ==
=== Main ===
- Paul Wight / Big Show as himself, a professional wrestler who is adjusting to both retirement and his oldest daughter moving in with him and his family
- Allison Munn as Cassy Wight, Show's supportive wife and mother of Mandy and J.J. She works as a real estate agent.
- Reylynn Caster as Lola Wight, Show's oldest daughter from his first marriage. She moves from Minnesota to Florida after her mother gets transferred to Brussels. She loves her father even though they can be competitive with each other.
- Lily Brooks O'Briant as Mandy Wight, Show's middle daughter. She admires women leaders such as Ruth Bader Ginsburg, Alexandria Ocasio-Cortez, and Leslie Knope. In the series, she is running for student body president.
- Juliet Donenfeld as Jennifer Jane "J.J." Wight, Show's youngest daughter. She is a precocious child that likes to hack into things.

=== Recurring ===
- Jaleel White as Terence "Terry" Malick III, Show's best friend. He runs a fitness center. He likes to invent things.
- Ben Giroux as Coach Leslie Fener, Lola's ice hockey coach
- Jaime Moyer as Miss Riggi, J.J.'s teacher
- Asif Ali, as Bennett Patel, Cassy's co-worker and apprentice at the real estate company. He is the son of the neglectful company head (who later fired him because he touched him)
- Dallas Dupree Young as Taylor Swift (named after the country-turned pop singer), an easy-going classmate of Mandy's who runs against her for class president. His real given name is Cliff.
- Tessa Espinola as Monica B., Mandy's classmate who is a big influencer at school. She hosts livestreams on the latest gossip.
- Jolie Hoang-Rappaport as Kennedy, Mandy's airheaded friend
- Emma Loewen as Olivia, Mandy's friend

Guests for the sitcom included former WWE wrestlers Mick Foley, Mark Henry, Rikishi, and Queer Eye's Tan France.

== Episodes ==
Series overview
Season	Episodes	Originally released
1	8	April 6, 2020
Special	1	December 9, 2020

=== Season 1 (2020) ===
No. overall	No. in season	Title	Directed by	Written by	Original release date
1	1	"Prototype"	Phill Lewis	Josh Bycel & Jason Berger	April 6, 2020
Lola moves to Tampa where she will live with her father Big Show, her stepmother and half-sisters, and has a hard time fitting in. Show convinces the coach to have Lola try out for the school's ice hockey team. Meanwhile, Mandy hosts a sit-in at her bedroom that attracts a lot of visitors.
2	2	"The Big Punisher"	Phill Lewis	Danielle Uhlarik	April 6, 2020
After attending JJ's career day, Big Show ponders what to do for his next career, and tries tagging along as a real estate agent to Cassy who is trying to show an old house. Lola and Mandy try becoming roommates but problems arise.
3	3	"The Big Brain"	Bob Koherr	Josh Bycel & Jason Berger	April 6, 2020
JJ's teacher wants to recommend JJ to the gifted class. Mandy is running for class president until her classmate Taylor Swift decides to run. After going to visit to the nail salon, Lola is getting along with Cassy as friends. But after attending a music event together, Lola wants to get a tattoo.
4	4	"The Big Sinkhole"	Phill Lewis	Joanna Quraishi	April 6, 2020
A sinkhole near the girls' school causes the school to be closed. The girls have to hang out with the parents for the day. Big Show is going to do a cooking segment on television with Lola, while Cassy takes JJ to her real estate agency. Mandy tries to strategize how to get ahead on her class president campaign, but ends up in a relationship with Taylor.
5	5	"The Big Process"	Bob Koherr	Brian D. Bradley	April 6, 2020
JJ and Mandy try to help Cassy deal with being unemployed. When Lola's new boyfriend invites Big Show to do an escape room with them, Big Show gets along with him too well. Tan France of Queer Eye guest stars.
6	6	"The Big Party"	Kelly Park	Paul O'Toole & Andy St. Clair	April 6, 2020
For their anniversary, Big Show takes Cassy to a weekend on a cruise ship. But although he has some romantic activities planned with her, Cassy finally gets an offer to buy that house she was trying to sell, and Big Show ends up sharing his amenities with some of his WWE wrestler friends (Mark Henry, Mick Foley and Rikishi). Lola volunteers to babysit her sisters, but hosts a big party for Mandy so that she can become popular.
7	7	"The Big Surprise"	Leonard R. Garner, Jr.	Danielle Uhlarik	April 6, 2020
Lola's friend Alex visits from Minnesota. Terry hosts a promotional event where Big Show wrestles with people at Terry's gym. Mandy has to debate Taylor at a school debate. JJ senses that Lola might want to return to Minnesota to be with her friends, so she has Cassy help her make a video to convince her to stay. Mandy and Taylor agree to have a friendly debate where they don't bring up anything disagreeable until Taylor comes up with an idea that Mandy has to disagree with, which costs them their relationship. Following another wrestling demo at Terry's, Big Show announces he wants to return to the WWE.
8	8	"The Big Decision"	Eric Dean Seaton	Brian D. Bradley	April 6, 2020
Big Show tries to set up his family situation so he can return to wrestling with the WWE. Cassy ends up hiring Bennett; JJ tries to take in a pet dog despite knowing that her dad has allergies. Lola feels more stressed out as she takes her driving test.

=== Christmas Special (2020) ===
No. overall	No. in season	Title	Directed by	Written by	Original release date
9	1	"The Big Christmas"	Jody Margolin Hahn	Jen McCartney	December 9, 2020
With Big Show stuck at home with a broken leg, Cassy does the mall Santa duties of answering to kids' wishes, but she gets a bit out of control. The girls go on a treasure hunt throughout the house to look for their Christmas gifts.

== Production ==
The show was produced by WWE Studios and was broadcast on Netflix. Josh Bycel and Jason Berger were executive producers and showrunners, with Susan Levison and Richard Lowell serving as executive producers for WWE Studios. In September 2019, Big Show announced on "Stone Cold" Steve Austin's podcast that the show had filmed three episodes and would premiere around the time of WrestleMania 36 in April 2020. Later, it was announced that all 8 episodes would premiere on April 6, 2020, on Netflix. On August 31, 2020, Netflix opted not to order a second season for the series, but would end the series with a Christmas special, which was released on December 9, 2020.

== Reception ==
Joel Keller of Decider wrote that the sitcom was "okay to stream", and that Berger and Bycel's "comedy pedigrees help make the show a tiny bit better than your average TGIF/Nick/Disney family sitcom. That doesn't mean that it's a good show, but at least it's not terrible". Keller added that Big Show can do physical comedy "very well", while praising Munn for "handl[ing] it like a pro" and describing the daughter characters as the "usual mix of overly-verbal and super-precocious kids". Matt Fowler of IGN described the show as having "the potential to be either wholly terrible or fully great. The truth, overall, lies somewhere in between as Big Show proves himself to be an amiable, glowing, towering 'family man' capable of carrying multi-cam sitcom shenanigans". Randall Colbum of The A.V. Club also likened the sitcom to the TGIF sitcoms of the 1990s, and wrote: "As tends to happen in these sorts of stories, the very act of a man so large demonstrating vulnerability is all the punchline an audience needs." Common Sense Media gave the show three out of five stars, describing it as "a little rough, but mostly sweet".

== See also ==
- Game On: A Comedy Crossover Event
