= Guy Raz =

American journalist

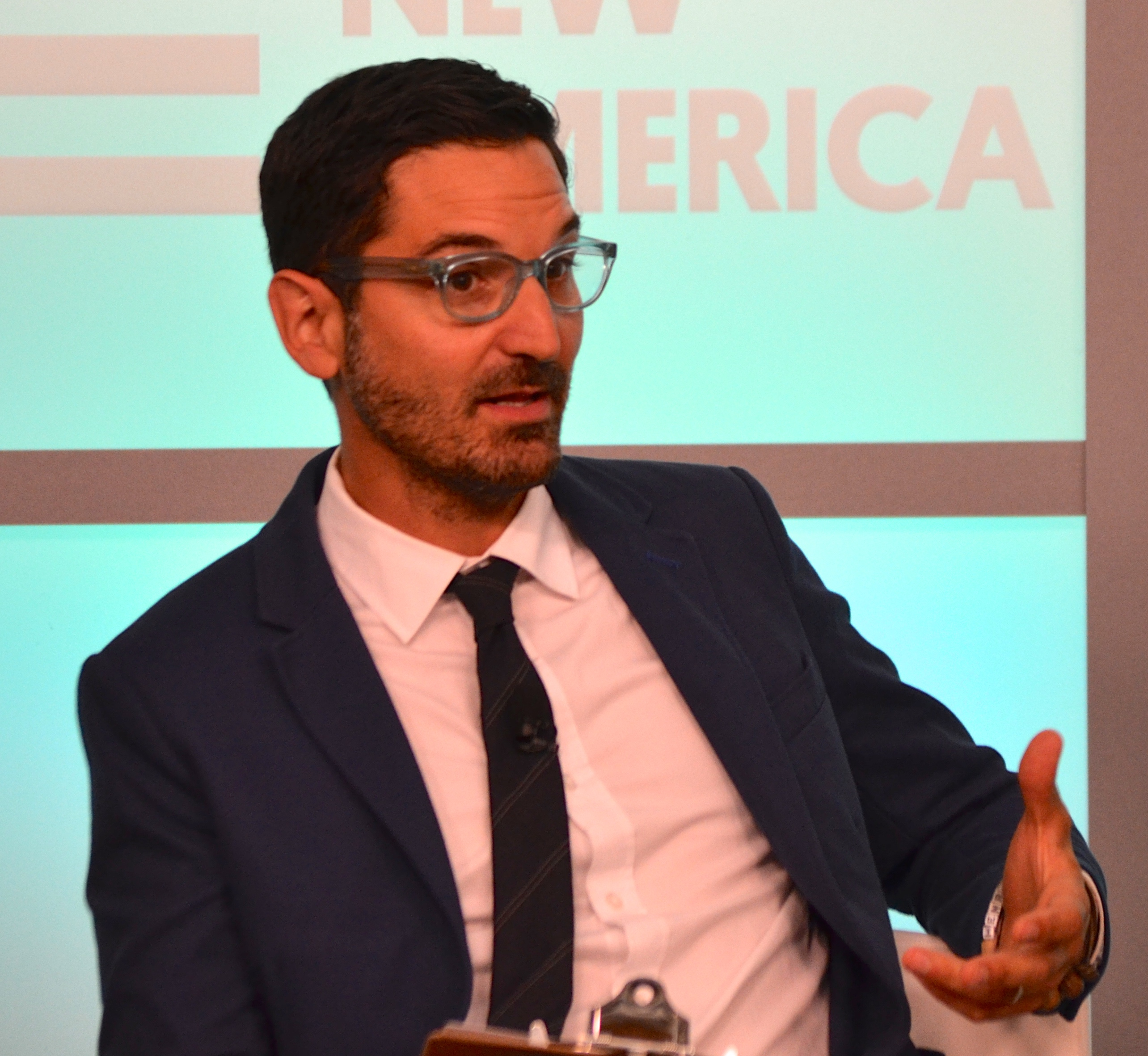
- Raz in 2015
- Born: November 9, 1975 (age 50); West Covina, California, U.S.
- Education: Brandeis University; Cambridge University
- Occupations: Journalist; Radio Host; Podcaster
- Years active: 1997-present
- Known for: Serving as NPR bureau chief in Berlin, London; as their Pentagon correspondent; as a CNN correspondent in Jerusalem; as an NPR program host and founder
- Notable work: Weekend All Things Considered; TED Radio Hour; How I Built This; Wow in the World; Wisdom from the Top; The Great Creators
- Spouse: Hannah Raz (wife)

Guy Raz (/ˈɡaɪ ˈrɑːz/; born November 9, 1975) is an American journalist and podcaster. After degrees at Brandeis and Cambridge, and early positions writing for newspapers (including the Washington Post), Raz began work with NPR. There, he went on to serve as their bureau chief in Berlin (2000-2002) and London (2002-2004), and as their Pentagon correspondent (2006-2008), with an intervening stint as a CNN correspondent in Jerusalem (2004-2006). He went on to host NPR's Weekend All Things Considered (2009-2012) and then their TED Radio Hour (2012-2019). He followed this by creating the new NPR programs, How I Built This (2016), Wow in the World (2017), Wisdom from the Top (2019), and The Great Creators (2022). In 2018, NPR noted, along with The New York Times, that Raz was, at that time, the only person to ever have had three podcasts simultaneously among Apple’s top 20 programs.

Raz has been the recipient of a number of journalistic fellowships and awards, including a Burns Fellowship (1999) and subsequent Burns Award, an RIAS Berlin fellowship (2000) and subsequent RIAS Berlin Award, Harvard's Nieman journalism fellowship (2008), and again in that year, the RTNDA's Edward R. Murrow Award and the Daniel Schorr Journalism Prize (the latter given to a young, rising journalist in public radio), in both cases for a series of reports on military-medical evacuations from Iraq.

== Early life and education ==
Raz was born on November 9, 1975 in West Covina, California. He graduated from Brandeis University in 1996, and received his master's degree in history from Cambridge University.

== Career ==
In 1997, at the age of 22, Raz joined NPR as an intern for NPR's afternoon news program All Things Considered. In 1998, he served as personal research assistant to former "Murrow Boy" NPR Senior News analyst Daniel Schorr.

He then served as a general assignment reporter for NPR, covering, e.g., the 2000 presidential primaries, and the story behind the famous Doors song "Light My Fire" (where he interviewed surviving members of the band).

Raz also wrote for other publications during this time, including for the Washington City Paper, (during the tenure of editor David Carr), as well as for The Washington Post, among others.

In 2000, Raz was appointed NPR's Berlin bureau chief. At age 25, he was NPR's youngest overseas bureau chief. He covered "the wars in Iraq, Afghanistan and Macedonia, and the ongoing conflict in Israel and the Palestinian territories", as well as stories from Eastern Europe and the Balkans, including the conflict in Kosovo. He became NPR's London bureau chief (in 2002). While in London, Raz covered stories across Europe and the Middle East, including the Iraq War where he spent more than 6 months in 2003 and 2004.

He served as CNN's correspondent in Jerusalem from 2004–2006. During his time at CNN, Raz covered the death of Yasser Arafat, the rise of Hamas, Israel's withdrawal from Gaza and parts of the West Bank, and the incapacitation of Israeli Prime Minister Ariel Sharon.

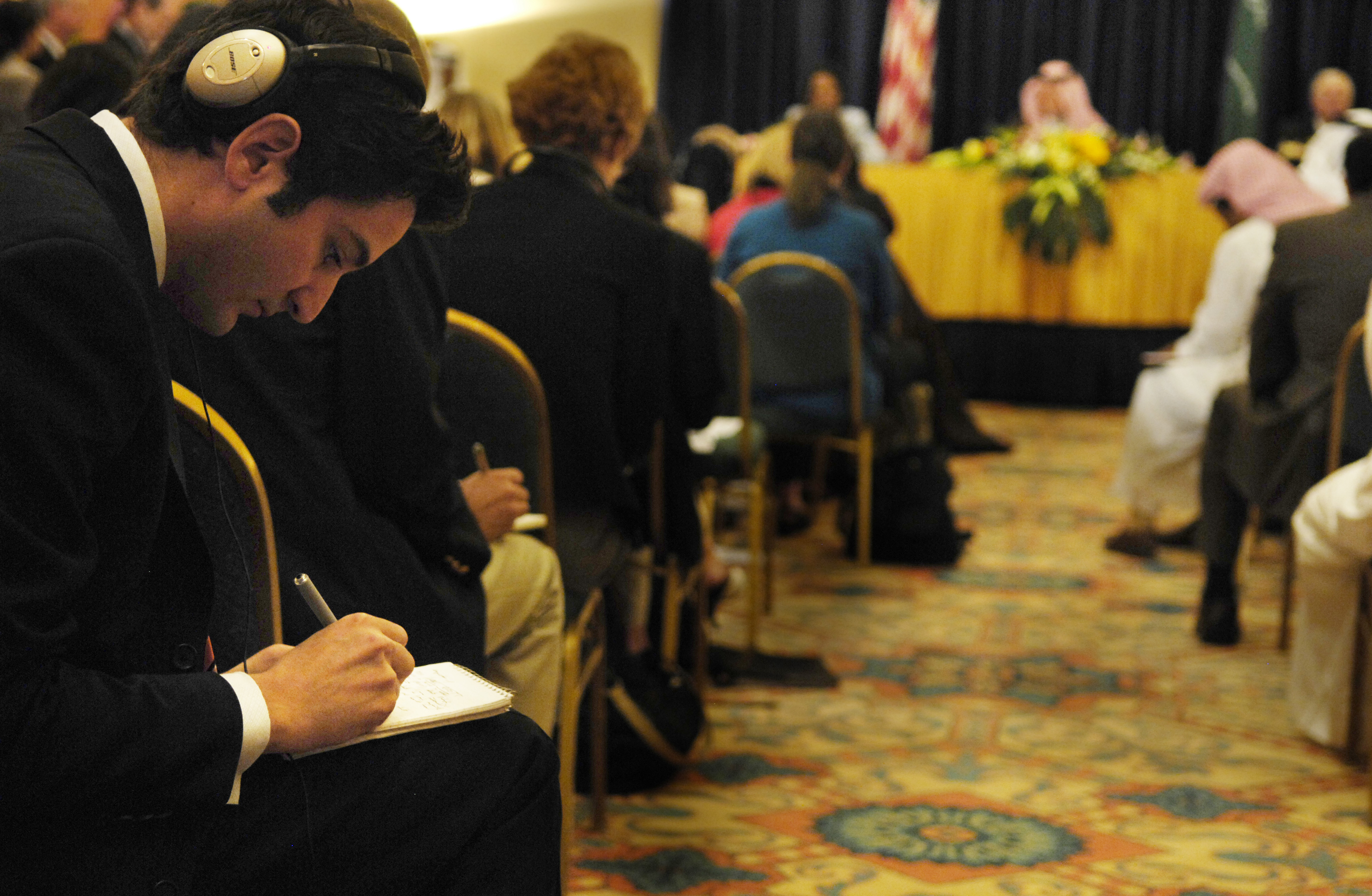
Guy Raz, National Public Radio, takes notes during a press conference with Secretary of Defense Robert M. Gates, Secretary of State Condoleezza Rice and Saudi Foreign Minister Saud Al-Faisal in Jeddah, Saudi Arabia, August 1, 2007. Gates and Rice were in the Middle East to discuss regional affairs and the U.S.'s long-term relationship with Saudi Arabia. Released Defense Dept. photo, taken by Cherie A. Thurlby.

Following the two years with CNN, he returned to NPR in 2006 as a defense correspondent, assigned to the U.S. military and The Pentagon.

After spending 2008 as a Nieman Fellow (see Awards and recognition)—an NPR work sabbatical—Raz became the host of Weekend All Things Considered in 2009. As described by James Fallows for The Atlantic, Raz, alongside colleagues Matt Martinez, Phil Harrell, and Steve Lickteig, gave the program "an edge and a spirit" that led Fallows to "tremendously enjo[y it] as a listener". One innovation they introduced was beginning the show with an opening segment "comparable in ambition and range to a magazine cover story", likewise named, their episode's "Cover Story"; as well, they added a segment called "Three-Minute Fiction", and "strong music segments". Then, Raz created a weekly podcast to accompany the show, a first for an NPR newsmagazine. He went on to host Weekend All Things Considered from 2009 to 2012.

In December 2012, he stepped down from that position in order to expand the TED Radio Hour into a new weekly program to air on NPR beginning in March 2013. For podcast episodes posting in 2017, this NPR podcast was noted as being in the top 20 of most-downloaded in the United States across all devices (placing in sixth position).

=== 2016–present ===
In September 2016, Raz started hosting a new podcast on NPR, called How I Built This, about entrepreneurship. In 2017, it became one of the 20 most-downloaded podcasts in the United States. The first episode featured the founder of Spanx, Sara Blakely. He is the founder of the associated production company, Built-It Productions. Wondery began licensing How I Built This in 2022.

In 2017, award-winning children's host Mindy Thomas joined Raz to co-create NPR's first children's program, the podcast Wow in the World; Raz and Thomas also created a children's production company, Tinkercast, which produces Wow in the World.

Raz announced he was stepping down from hosting the TED Radio Hour at the end of 2019. In 2019, Raz became the host of Wisdom from the Top, a podcast on leadership from Luminary. In 2022, he launched The Great Creators, a podcast produced by Built-It Productions and distributed by Amazon Music/Wondery. The show features conversations about creativity with celebrated actors, musicians, comedians and other performers.

== Awards and recognition ==
In 1999, Raz was awarded a Burns Fellowship to Germany to embark on a 2-month reporting assignment; his reporting there would win the Burns Award for distinguished writing. In the summer of 2000, Raz reported from Germany as a RIAS Berlin fellow. His work on German "Leitkultur" was awarded the RIAS Berlin Award.

Raz has stated on his personal webpage, dating to May 2017, that, "[i]n 2008, he spent a year as a Nieman journalism fellow at Harvard University[,] where he studied classical history. During his time covering the Pentagon, Raz was awarded RTNDA's 2008 Edward R. Murrow Award in the "News Series" category for a 3-part series on military-medical evacuations from Iraq, and the 2008 Daniel Schorr Journalism Prize given to "a rising public media journalist 35 years of age or younger ... particularly young journalists who have found a calling in public radio", also for his coverage of the Iraq medical evacuation subject.

According to his employer, NPR, Raz was the first, and "is the only person [as of November 2018] to ever have three shows simultaneously in Apple’s top 20 podcasts".

== Personal life ==
As of November 2018, Raz married Hannah Raz, a consultant. As of July 2018, he was described as having a wife and two sons, ages 9 and 7, and living in Washington, D.C. Raz has also been described as having lived in the San Francisco Bay Area.

Raz and his wife include in their circle of friends Stewart Butterfield, a founder of Slack, and Jen Rubio, a co-founder of Away.

In July 2018, Hannah Raz had described her husband as an early riser, and his hobbies as including a love of cooking.
