= Six Minutes (podcast) =

Mystery podcast

- Genre: Science fiction podcast
- Format: Audio drama

Cast and voices
- Starring: Shahadi Wright Joseph; Zeph Maffei; Lily Brooks O’Briant; Amy Hutchins; Michael Crane; Isabella Denissen; Ava DeMary; Ryan Shanahan; Dennis Connors; Sam Oz Stone; Isabella Ferreira; Graham Stevens; Aaliyah Habeeb; Rob Bogue; Presley Ryan; Jude may

Production
- Length: Of all 5 seasons, the average episode is 8 minutes and 18 seconds, and listening to all 5 seasons would take roughly 2 days & 4 hrs straight

Publication
- No. of seasons: 5
- No. of episodes: 379
- Original release: March 1, 2018

Related
- Related shows: The Unexplainable Disappearance of Mars Patel; The Alien Adventures of Finn Caspian; Becoming Mother Nature
- Website: gzmshows.com/shows/listing/six-minutes/

Six Minutes is an all-ages family podcast by Gen-Z Media comprising more than 300 episodes over 5 seasons. The third and fourth seasons are sequels of the show, titled Six Minutes: Out of Time. They were released in early March 2023 and late September 2024 respectively. New episodes come out every Tuesday, as of December 30. Season 5 is called Out of Time. It released in October 2025, and new episodes come out on Tuesdays as of December 2025.

Both the original podcast and the sequels were co-created by Gen-Z Media founders David Kreizman, Benjamin Strouse, and Chris Tarry. Tom Casiello is the head writer, and the scripts are written by Nidhi Mehta and Marla Kanelos. The original podcast was directed by Michelle Tattenbaum, while the sequel is directed by David Kreizman.

== History ==
Gen-Z Media was founded in 2016 by David Kreizman, Benjamin Strouse, and Chris Tarry. The company launched Six Minutes in March 2018.

== Premise ==
The protagonist is a 12-year-old girl named Holiday who was found stranded in the ocean off the coast of Alaska by the Anders family. Six Minutes: Out of Time is set three years after the finale of Six Minutes. The protagonist is Holiday's former classmate and frenemy, Brynleigh, who sets out to Florida to uncover the mystery of her missing mother.

== Production of the Show ==
The podcast was produced by Gen-Z Media in partnership with PRX. The podcast was later added to Wondery. The podcast was also translated into Spanish. Each episode is six minutes long.

=== Main cast and characters ===
- Shahadi Wright Joseph as Holiday (seasons 1–3)/Valeria Gonzalez as Holiday (season 4)
- Zeph Maffei as Cyrus Anders
- Lily Brooks O'Briant as Birdie Anders
- Amy Hutchins as Monica Anders
- Michael Crane as James Anders
- Ryan Shanahan as Badger
- Isabella Denissen as Casey Dupres
- Ava DeMary as Brynleigh Pasternack
- Dennis Connors as Magnus
- Sam Oz Stone as Adam/Bruce
- Isabella Ferreira as Cam
- Graham Stevens as Dr. J.P Whittier
- Aaliyah Habeeb as Angelica Graves (also Delphine)
- Rob Bogue as Mr. Pasternack

Additional main characters from Six Minutes: Out of Time

- Jonty Weston as Jude
- Sophia Kekllas as Kady/KC
- Judah Edwards as Penn
- Zoe Soleil as Remy
- Sol Crespo as Dr. Solstis
- Brent Mukai as Kazu
- Gabriella Scott as Angel
- Patrick Scott McDermott as River
- Cate Elephante as Sam

== Episodes ==
Series overview
| Season | Episodes | Originally released | |
| Season | Episodes | First released | Last released |
|---|---|---|---|
| 1 | 100 | March 1, 2018 | February 1, 2019 |
| 2 | 105 | February 11, 2019 | February 5, 2020 |
| 3 | 70 | March 14, 2023 | January 4, 2024 |
| 4 | 52 | September 24, 2024 | September 16, 2025 |
| 5 | 52 | October 14, 2025 | September 29, 2026 |

== Reception ==
Wil Williams wrote in Polygon that the show has "music that absolutely slaps."

== Adaptation ==
A deal has been made to create a three-book adaptation of the podcast with Razorbill of Penguin Random House.

== See also ==
- The Alien Adventures of Finn Caspian
- The Unexplainable Disappearance of Mars Patel
