= Wow in the World =

Children's podcast

- Genre: Kids and family, science, technology
- Language: English

Cast and voices
- Hosted by: Guy Raz; Mindy Thomas

Music
- Theme music composed by: The Pop Ups
- Opening theme: "The Golden Age (Wow In The World Theme Song)

Production
- Production: Tinkercast, LLC
- Length: 30-45 minutes

Publication
- No. of seasons: 6
- No. of episodes: Over 300
- Original release: May 15, 2017 – present
- Provider: Wondery (since September 2021) Previously: NPR (May 2017-April 2021) Sony Music Entertainment (April–September 2021)

Related
- Website: Official website Spotify Apple Podcasts

Wow in the World is a children's podcast hosted by children's media and audio veterans Guy Raz and Mindy Thomas. which debuted on May 17, 2017 and produced by Tinkercast, LLC, a company established by Thomas and Raz to produce children's audio., and distributed by Wondery. Initially, it was distributed by NPR as part of its efforts to invest in podcasts and digital media aimed at wider audiences, including families, as well as Guy Raz's connections to the broadcaster for producing popular shows like the TED Radio Hour and the business podcast How I Built This. Distribution was handed over to Sony Music in April 2021, but the deal with Sony was very short lived. The Amazon-owned podcast network Wondery agreed to distribute the Tinkercast assets in September the same year. The show focuses on science and technology and each episodes is about 25 minutes long. However some episodes, such as the spin-off game show Two Whats?! And a Wow!!! are 15 minutes long and other bonus episodes may run for 5–10 minutes.

== Background ==
In 2014, Guy Raz and Mindy Thomas had a Twitter exchanged that led to some collaborations. The show was financed by its hosts and is recorded in Thomas's basement studio in Fairfax, Virginia. They began producing episodes for Wow in the World together and the podcast debuted on May 15, 2017. The podcast is the first children's podcast to be distributed by NPR. The show is produced by Tinkercast. Each episode is about 25 minutes long. The theme song is by The Pop Ups. The podcast's intended audience is children between the ages of 5 and 12 years old. The hosts of the show cite their sources during the program. The podcast is a science and technology focused program. On April 6, 2019, the show did a live event at Tampa Theatre. By 2020, the show had produced four seasons. During the COVID-19 pandemic, the hosts of the show started a spinoff series called Two Whats?! and a Wow!. Two Whats?! and a Wow! released daily episodes. Tinkercast also started a spinoff called Camp WeWow. On November 22, 2021, the show did a special episode discussing the importance of the COVID-19 vaccine.

== Reception ==
Charlotte Hilton Andersen wrote in Reader's Digest that the hosts "have a knack for picking science stories that kids will find fascinating". ABC News said of the show that "Curious kids will be captivated, and you'll find it hard not to love it too."

=== Awards ===
Award	Date	Category	Result	Ref.
AAAs / Subaru Prize	2022	Excellence in Science Books	Finalist	
Discover Pods Awards	2020	Best Kids & Family Podcast	Finalist	
Discover Pods Awards	2021	Best Kids & Family Podcast	Runner-up	
iHeartRadio Podcast Awards	2019	Best Kids & Family Podcast	Won	
iHeartRadio Podcast Awards	2020	Best Kids & Family Podcast	Nominated	
iHeartRadio Podcast Awards	2021	Best Kids & Family Podcast	Won	
iHeartRadio Podcast Awards	2022	Best Kids & Family Podcast	Nominated	

== Adaptation ==
The podcast was adapted into a book series. The first book in the series was titled Wow in the World: The How and Wow of The Human Body and the second was titled Wow in the Wild: The Amazing World of Animals. The intended audience of the book series is children ages 7–10. The book was discussed at the 2021 Los Angeles Times Festival of Books as well as the 2021 San Antonio Book Festival. The books are written by Mindy Thomas and Guy Raz with illustrations by Jack Teagle.
