= Flyest Fables =

Fantasy podcast for children

- Cover art created by Gracie Canaan
- Genre: Hopepunk
- Format: Audio drama anthology
- Language: English

Creative team
- Created by: Morgan Givens
- Written by: Morgan Givens

Cast and voices
- Hosted by: Morgan Givens

Production
- Direction: Bayla Metzger; Catherine St. Louis; Amanda Williams; Stephanie Logan
- Production: Morgan Givens
- Length: 10–25 minutes

Publication
- No. of seasons: 2
- No. of episodes: 15
- Original release: October 1, 2018
- Updates: Biweekly

Related
- Website: www.morgangivens.com/flyest-fables/

Flyest Fables is a hopepunk and fantasy podcast written, created, and produced by Morgan Givens.

== Background ==
Givens was the first openly transgender recruit at the Metropolitan Police Department of the District of Columbia, but decided to switch careers after a few years with the comment that "if you do that job too long, you can lose yourself. And I didn’t like that." The inspiration for the show came from Givens' nephew. The show is intended to provide a diversity of characters within the fantasy genre. The intended audience for the show was young black kids, but the characters include people from a variety of backgrounds. The show covers difficult topics such as homelessness, unemployment, loneliness, depression, and bullying in an age-appropriate manner.

The story follows a young boy named Antoine who is being bullied at school. Antoine finds a magical book that transports him to the Kingdom of Orleans where he assists Princess Keisha in saving her mother. Some of the stories are modern adaptions of older fables while others are entirely new.

The show won the 2020 Audio Verse Awards for best "Storytelling Production" and Givens won best "Storyteller in a Storytelling Production."

== See also ==
- List of children's podcasts
