= The Unexplainable Disappearance of Mars Patel =

Science fiction podcast for children

- Genre: Children's podcast; Science fiction podcast
- Format: Audio drama
- Language: English

Creative team
- Created by: Benjamin Strouse; Chris Tarry; David Kreizman; Jenny Turner Hall
- Written by: David Kreizman; Benjamin Strouse; Chris Tarry; Jenny Turner Hall; Nidhi Mehta
- Directed by: Jenny Turner Hall; Michelle Tattenbaum

Cast and voices
- Starring: Jaiya Chetram; Natalie Mehl; Kate Wolfson; Wyatt Ralff; Carter Minor; Rileigh McDonald; Mairead O'Neil; Brandon Simms; Shane Epstein-Petrullo; Courtney Chu; Fiona Kreizman; Michael Perilstein; Lipica Shah; Ilana Ransom-Toeplitz; Charlie Pollock
- Voices: Oliver Gould; Chloe Tarry; Oliver Kreizman; Arthur Strouse; Logan Hall; Daniel Maloof; Emma Hankey; Eliana Brenden; Dash Kreizman; Jennifer Roszell, Graham Stevens; Alexa Ralph; Dina Perlman; Robbie Berry; Tabitha Ginsberg

Music
- Composed by: Shawn Pierce; Chris Tarry; Alan Friedman; Paul Connolly; Chris Suilit

Production
- Production: Benjamin Strouse; Rebecca Hanover
- Length: 15–30 minutes

Publication
- No. of seasons: 3
- No. of episodes: 30
- Original release: October 2, 2016 – September 20, 2021
- Provider: Blobfish Radio; Gen-Z Media; Pinna.fm Network

Related
- Related shows: Six Minutes; The Alien Adventures of Finn Caspian
- Website: gzmshows.com/shows/listing/mars-patel/

The Unexplainable Disappearance of Mars Patel is a children's audio drama and science fiction podcast produced by Blobfish Radio, Gen-Z Media, and Pinna.fm Network. The show won a Peabody Award in 2016 and was later adapted into books and optioned for a television show.

== Background ==
The show was produced by Blobfish Radio, Gen-Z Media, and Pinna.fm Network. The voice actors for the main characters are played by middle school children. According to The New York Times, the appropriate age audience for the show is eight to twelve years old. The show originally debuted in 2016, but the episodes were re-released in 2021.

The podcast is a mystery that follows an eleven year old Indian boy named Manu "Mars" Patel and his friends Caddie Pratchett, JP McGowan, and Randall "Toothpick" Lee as they investigate the disappearance of their friends Aurora Gershowitz and Jonas Hopkins. The protagonists suspect that a technology business magnate named Oliver Pruitt is responsible for the disappearances. Throughout the story the characters piece together clues from various mediums such as emails, newspapers, instant messages, and transcripts. Mars Patel and his friends eventually travel to the planet Mars to investigate Oliver Pruitt's space colony.

=== Cast and characters ===
- Manu "Mars" Patel
- Caddie Patchet
- Juniper "JP" McGowan
- Randall "Toothpick" Lee
- Jonas Hopkins
- Julia "Lost in London"
- Aurora Gershowitz
- Orion
- Axel "Thunderbolt"
- Daisy Zheng
- Epica Hernandez
- Oliver Pruitt
- Saira Patel
- The Computer "HELGA"
- Mr. Q
- Layla "Lala"
- Bilal
- Brielle "Bell"
- Mason
- Maria
- Cameron
- Lennox

== Reception ==
Melissa Locker of The Guardian, praised the show saying that it was an "adventurous kids podcast, reminiscent of old-time radio dramas." Amanda Hess of The New York Times called the show "the 'Serial' of children's podcasts." Steve Greene of IndieWire praised the show, saying that it was a "mystery investigation with just the right dash of whimsy and a healthy dose of scientific curiosity baked into it."

The show has similar themes to the Netflix original television show called Stranger Things.

The show was used as an educational aid in Warren Township Schools classrooms.

=== Awards ===
Award	Year	Category	Result	Ref.
Peabody Awards	2016	Podcast & Radio	Won	
Webby Awards	2017	Podcasts—Drama	Nominated	
Webby Awards	2017	Podcasts—Best Sound Design/ Original Music Score 2017	Nominated	
Scribe Awards	2021	Young Adult / Middle Grade	Nominated	

== Adaptions ==
The book series was written by children's author Sheela Chari and published by Walker Books. The first book is a 287-page adaption of the first season of the podcast, which was published on October 6, 2020. The second book is a 304-page adaption of the second season of the podcast, which was published on October 12, 2021.

The show was optioned for a Disney+ television show.

== See also ==
- List of children's podcasts
- List of science fiction podcasts
