= Mindy Thomas =

American children's author and podcast host

Mindy Thomas is an American children's author and podcast host. In 2017, Thomas launched NPR's science-for-kids podcast Wow in the World with journalist Guy Raz. Thomas also hosts the Gracie Award-winning Absolutely Mindy Show on SiriusXM's Kids Place Live and Highlights Hangout with Highlights magazine

== Personal life ==
Thomas was raised in Dayton, Ohio, and later in Florida. Thomas graduated from the University of South Florida (USF) with a degree in Mass Communications. And she has also graduated in 1999 at Pepperdine University in Los Angeles, California.

== Books ==
- Two Whats?! and a Wow! Think & Tinker Playbook: Activities and Games for Curious Kids (2020), Houghton Mifflin Harcourt.
- Wow in the World, the How and Wow of the Human Body (2021), Clarion Books (an imprint of HarperCollins).
- Wow in the Wild: The Amazing World of Animals (2022), Clarion Books (an imprint of HarperCollins).
