= Sean O'Connor (comedian) =

American comedian, writer, and producer

- Born: May 8, 1985 (age 41); United States
- Occupations: Comedian, writer, producer
- Years active: 2004–present
- Notable work: The Late Late Show with James Corden, Solar Opposites, Close Enough
- Spouse: Erin Magner
- Children: 1

Sean O'Connor (born May 8, 1985) is an American comedian, writer, and producer best known for his work on The Late Late Show with James Corden, Solar Opposites, and Strip Law. He is based out of Los Angeles.

== Career ==
=== Comedy ===
After moving from New York City to Los Angeles in 2011, O'Connor was selected to perform as a "New Face" at the Just for Laughs Comedy Festival in Montreal, Quebec, Canada. He has appeared on Conan twice, and had his own Comedy Central Stand-Up Presents,

In 2013, O'Connor released his debut album, James Dean Type on Aspecialthing Records, about which one Paste magazine reviewer said,"The beauty of Sean O'Connor's stand-up lies in the fact that he sounds nothing like a stand-up."

== Writing and producing ==
Two weeks after moving to LA, O'Connor was hired as a staff writer on Sports Show with Norm Macdonald. This was the start of a busy career in television comedy writing, including mini-series The Ben Show with Ben Hoffman (2013) and D.I.R.T. Comedy (2013) and full series Lucas Bros. Moving Co. (2014-2015), Major Lazer (2015), Stone Quackers (2014-2015), The New Negroes (2019), What Just Happened??! (2019), and Solar Opposites (2020)—where he was also credited as a consulting producer. He also served as head writer on Norm Macdonald Live (2013-2016) and both Hood Adjacent with James Davis (2017), and Lights Out with David Spade (2020), for which he was also the executive producer.

He wrote for a variety of specials including the 2011 MTV Movie Awards, 2011 MTV Video Music Awards, 2012 ESPY Awards, and Seth Rogen's Hilarity for Charity (2018). O'Connor created the concept of the House Show—as well as serving on the writing team for three years—for The Late Late Show with James Corden, and most recently has been pulling double duty as the head writer/co-executive producer of A Little Late with Lilly Singh (2019 - 2021) and the co-executive producer of HBO Max's animated hit Close Enough, which was renewed for a third season in 2021.
