= New York City Independent Film Festival =

- Location: New York City, United States
- Founded: 2009
- Website: www.nycindieff.com

The New York City Independent Film Festival (also known as NYC Independent Film Festival, NYCIndieFF) is an annual film festival held in New York City. It was founded in 2009 by Dennis Cieri and Bonnie Rush. The festival has screened over 1,800 movies from 81 countries since it began in 2010.
