= Solar Opposites =

American animated sitcom

- Genre: Adult animation; Animated sitcom; Science fiction
- Created by: Justin Roiland; Mike McMahan
- Showrunners: Mike McMahan; Josh Bycel
- Voices of: Justin Roiland; Thomas Middleditch; Sean Giambrone; Mary Mack; Dan Stevens
- Composer: Chris Westlake
- Country of origin: United States
- Original language: English
- No. of seasons: 6
- No. of episodes: 63 (list of episodes)

Production
- Executive producers: Justin Roiland; Mike McMahan; Josh Bycel; Anthony Chun; Sydney Ryan; Danielle Uhlarik; Dominic Dierkes
- Producers: Sydney Ryan; J. Michael Mendel; Joe Saunders; Grace Parra Janney
- Editors: Lee Harting; Nick Reczynski
- Running time: 21–26 minutes
- Production companies: Important Science; Justin Roiland's Solo Vanity Card Productions!; 20th Television (Note: Known as 20th Century Fox Television for the first season.); 20th Television Animation (Note: Was still credited as 20th Television in Holiday Special on Disney+ prints outside US, also still credited on screen as "A 20th Television Production" until 2022.)

Original release
- Network: Hulu
- Release: May 8, 2020 – October 13, 2025

Solar Opposites is an American adult animated sitcom created by Justin Roiland and Mike McMahan for Hulu. The series follows a family of aliens consisting of Korvo, Terry, Yumyulack, and Jesse, who escape their doomed homeworld and arrive on Earth with a mission to protect their infant Pupa, which will eventually evolve to terraform the planet and destroy humanity. While Korvo and Yumyulack dislike humans and their culture, Terry and Jesse quickly adapt to living on Earth. The series also features a "show-within-a-show" subplot titled "The Wall", which follows a society of humans that have been shrunk down by Yumyulack and kept inside a large terrarium built into his bedroom wall.

The voice cast consists of Justin Roiland as Korvo, Thomas Middleditch as Terry, Sean Giambrone as Yumyulack, and Mary Mack as Jesse. After Roiland was removed from the series in early 2023, Dan Stevens replaced him as Korvo starting with the fourth season. Recurring guest stars include: Carlos Alazraqui, Clancy Brown, Sterling K. Brown, Kieran Culkin, Andy Daly, Sutton Foster, Tiffany Haddish, Christina Hendricks, Alfred Molina, Charlotte Nicdao, Nolan North, Rob Schrab, and Kari Wahlgren.

The series was originally developed for Fox, but was later moved to Hulu in 2018 and given a two-season order. It premiered on May 8, 2020, and concluded on October 13, 2025, after six seasons consisting of 63 episodes. Four holiday specials were also released, starting with the second season. Since its debut, the series received positive critical reviews and became one of Hulu's most-watched comedies.

== Premise ==
Solar Opposites centers on Korvo, Terry, Jesse, and Yumyulack — a family of aliens who crash land on Earth and are forced to stay there, often disagreeing on whether this is a good thing. The family comes from Planet Shlorp, an advanced alien world that sent out one hundred ships — each carrying two adults and their replicants — to colonize new planets shortly before their home planet was destroyed by an asteroid.

The series also features parallel storylines, the most prominent of which follows a society of humans shrunk by the replicant Yumyulack and imprisoned in a terrarium known as "the Wall". Starting in the third season, another storyline follows a group of intergalactic corrupt police officers, known as the SilverCops, that routinely arrest and brutalize Shlorpians fleeing from the destruction of their homeworlds.

== Voice cast and characters ==
=== Main ===
- Justin Roiland (seasons 1–3) and Dan Stevens (seasons 4–6) as Korvotron "Korvo" Opposites, an intelligent Shlorpian scientist who hates Earth and wants to leave as soon as possible. He is the designated leader of their mission to find a new world and later becomes Terry's husband.
- Thomas Middleditch as Terrance "Terry" Opposites, Korvo's evacuation partner and later husband, and the pupa specialist who enjoys being on Earth and is fascinated with human culture.
- Sean Giambrone as Yumyulack Opposites, Korvo's replicant/son who is a self-proclaimed scientist and bounty hunter. As a hobby, he shrinks adult humans who annoy him and keeps them inside a terrarium in his bedroom known as "the Wall". In the fifth season, Giambrone also portrays a fictionalized version of himself.
- Mary Mack as Jesse Opposites, Terry's replicant/daughter who is generally kind and wants to fit into human society.
- Sagan McMahan (Note: The Pupa is also voiced by Liam Cunningham in the first season finale.) as The Pupa, an infant, color-changing alien who will one day evolve into its true form and enact a process referred to as "terraforming"; xenoforming the Earth into a copy of the Shlorpian homeworld using the data stored in its DNA.

=== Supporting ===
==== Alien associates ====
- Tiffany Haddish as A.I.S.H.A., the Shlorpians' sassy artificial intelligence built into their ship
- Justin Roiland (seasons 1–2) and Eric Bauza (seasons 4, 6) as Chris the Red Goobler, a "red goobler" produced from Korvo via Terry-induced stress. His only purpose is to kill Korvo. He becomes engaged to a human woman and is portrayed as a "bro" archetype, often expressing his fondness for The Hangover movie, Joe Rogan, and tight polo shirts, later opening his own bar after Korvo turns his fiancée into a rat.
- Wendi McLendon-Covey as P.A.T.R.I.C.I.A. (season 1), a robot created by Korvo to serve as his wife. Their name stands for "Patricia Automated Television Retro‐fitted Intelligent Companion In Action."
- Tony Hale as Little Buddy (seasons 3–4), an artificial alien that hatched from an egg laid by the Pupa
- JK Sevens (seasons 5–6), a robot from the planet Clervix-3 who follows the Shlorpians back to Earth
- Dan Bakkedahl as Commander Zarck (seasons 5–6), the Shlorpian's original mission leader who was jettisoned out of their ship as part of a What If scenario and seeks revenge against them

==== Human associates ====
- Rob Schrab as Principal Principal Cooke, the principal at James Earl Jones High School, who is openly prejudiced against Yumyulack and Jesse and is engaging in a secret affair with Ms. Frankie. His first name is revealed to also be "Principal", making his full name and title "Principal Principal Cooke".
- Kari Wahlgren as Ms. Frankie, a teacher at James Earl Jones High School who is openly prejudiced against Yumyulack and Jesse and is engaging in a secret affair with Principal Cooke
- Natalie Morales as Ms. Perez (season 1), a gender studies teacher at James Earl Jones High School
- Ken Marino as Kevin (seasons 1, 4–6), a neighbor of the Shlorpians

==== The Wall ====
- Andy Daly as Lindsey Tim Weekly (seasons 1–3), one of Yumyulack's captives, shrunken down for wearing a red shirt. Tim becomes a scavenger and resistance leader against the Duke's regime, before taking his place.
- Christina Hendricks as Cherie, a former Benihana waitress placed in the Wall by Yumyulack for serving him shrimp he didn't want. She becomes one of Tim's allies in his fight against the Duke before being betrayed by Tim. She later gives birth to her and Tim's daughter, Pezlie, the first human to be born tiny. She then seeks to expose Tim for his crimes, saves her daughter when the Bowinian Church kidnaps her, and moves to the Backyard where she becomes queen of the Wall.
- Alfred Molina as Ringo / the Duke (seasons 1–2, 5–6), the corrupt ruler of Yumyulack's Wall, who maintains order and control by hoarding the supplies given to the Wall's inhabitants by Jesse. Ringo is later unintentionally resurrected with amnesia by Terry after using the make-alive ray on the Backyard.
- Tom Kenny as:
  - The Janitor (seasons 1, 3), the first person to be placed in the Wall who later hunts mosquitoes in the lower levels
  - Mark (season 3), a deliveryman and Allie's boyfriend
- Miguel Sandoval as Enrique (seasons 1–2), the father of Pedro and a member of Tim's resistance movement. After receiving insulin from the Duke, he betrays Tim and Cherie and becomes one of the Walldermen.
- Andrew Matarazzo as Pedro (season 1), Enrique's son who is trying to get his diabetic father insulin
- Jeannie Elias as Sister Sasha (seasons 1, 3), the first head of the Bowinian Church, who worship Jesse as their god
- Maurice LaMarche as Sonny (seasons 1–2), one of the Wallderman working for the Duke
- Nat Faxon as Bryson (season 1), a member of Tim's resistance movement
- Rainn Wilson as Steven (seasons 1, 3), the former CEO of AT&T who becomes a mouse milk farmer with his pet mouse, Molly, in the lower levels. After Molly's death during the Great Wall War, Steven retreats to the lower levels and gradually goes insane, eventually learning how to control the mosquitoes living in the Wall.
- Phil LaMarr as Jean-Pierre (season 1), a prisoner of the Duke and cellmate of Tim who joins his resistance movement
- Sterling K. Brown as Halk Hogam (seasons 2–3), A haunted war hero from the Great Wall War, member of Tim's resistance movement, and a former Bones executive story editor trying to solve a string of grisly murders. He later joins the Wall Council and becomes Cherie's ally.
- Kari Wahlgren as:
  - Nova / Sister Blista (seasons 2–4, 6), Halk's girlfriend, later wife, and the third head of the Bowinian Church
  - Pezlie (seasons 2–6), Cherie and Tim's infant daughter and the first human born tiny
  - Allie (season 3), the owner of a confectionery shop and Mark's girlfriend
  - Platinum Stevie (season 3), the leader of the Muck People, a group of cannibals living in the lower levels
- Vanessa Marshall as Mia (seasons 2, 5), the greeter of new arrivals to the Wall and later a citizen of Basketballburgh in the Backyard
- Jon Daly as Declan (season 2), a new arrival to the Wall and later one of Ethan's victims
- Nick Reczynski as Steve (season 2), a nutritionist who delivers fresh food to people in the Wall and later one of Ethan's victims
- Jimmi Simpson as Ethan (season 2), a depraved serial killer with a god complex who murders people in the Wall
- Sutton Foster as Sister Sisto (seasons 3–4), the second head of the Bowinian Church, who takes over and claims Pezlie as their messiah
- Eric Bauza as:
  - Blaine / Eyepatch Guy (season 3), a member of the expedition to the lower levels
  - Anthony (season 5), the leader of Sandbox Town in the Backyard
- Nolan North as:
  - Albert (seasons 3–5), the head of the Wall Council and later the leader of Basketballburgh in the Backyard
  - Joe Sanders (season 3), a member of the expedition to the lower levels
  - Pat (season 4), an enforcer for the Bowinian Church
  - Jerry (season 4), a disciple of the Bowinian Church who works in the market
- Lauren Tom as Nicole (season 3), the power minister and member of the Wall Council who joins the expedition to the lower levels
- Steve Hytner as Avocado Eggrolls (season 3), a member of the Muck People
- Carlos Alazraqui as Montez (seasons 4–6), the chief enforcer of the Bowinian Church who is secretly a spy working with Cherie and later escapes with her to the Backyard
- Lamorne Morris as Benny (season 4), an enforcer for the Bowinian Church
- Tim Heidecker as Garth (season 4), a farmer who discovers that the Wall is slowly getting colder
- Spencer Grammer as Lynette (season 4), a member of the Heathens, who joins Cherie to help save Pezlie from the Bowinian Church
- Fred Tatasciore as:
  - Jimmy (season 4), a member of the Heathens, who joins Cherie to help save Pezlie from the Bowinian Church
  - Little Richard / the Bounty Hunter (season 5), a ruthless killer working for Albert who travels across the Backyard on his pet lizard
- Clancy Brown as Gavin (season 5), a drifter who travels across the Backyard on his pet hedgehog, Hedgey, and is hired by Oscar to escort precious cargo
- Charlotte Nicdao as Sofia (season 5), Oscar's niece who joins Gavin on his journey in the Backyard
- Oscar Nunez as Oscar (season 5), the owner of a saloon in the settlement of Gutterville in the Backyard
- Troy Baker as McManus (season 5), a loanshark in the Backyard whom Gavin is in debt to
- Cree Summer as Rebecca Jones (season 6), a reporter for the Small Things Considered news broadcast
- Will Sasso as Skip (season 6), an impressionable man whom Cherie attempts to install as a puppet ruler
- Jess Harnell as the Blood Baron (season 6), a one-handed maniac who drinks blood
- Gary Anthony Williams as the Falcon (season 6), an aspiring dictator who speaks in the third person
- Colton Dunn as Greg (season 6), a womanizer masquerading as a skilled pilot
- Eliza Coupe as Nomi (season 6), part of the crew of the Ariana 1, who is fascinated with Yumyulack
- Beck Bennett as Chip "Oz" Ozmonski (season 6), the navigator for the crew of the Ariana 1
- Dan Stevens as Walter (season 6), the silent muscle for the crew of the Ariana 1

==== The SilverCops ====
- Kieran Culkin as Glen Kumstein / Dodge Charger (seasons 3–6), a neighbor of the Shlorpians who is later shot into space and joins the SilverCops. After becoming a wanted man, Glen changes his DNA to become a dog-like humanoid and renames himself "Dodge Charger", but after attending SilverCop bootcamp, he joins the GoldCops.
- Christopher Meloni as LoneSun (season 3), the leader of a squad of SilverCops who recruit Glen
- Carlos Alazraqui as Ventrez (season 3), the second-in-command of LoneSun's squad
- Blake Perlman as:
  - Glorgax (season 3), an insectoid alien and member of LoneSun's squad
  - Quigonowski (season 5), an insectoid alien and a SilverCop grunt during the war against the Equinites
- Sutton Foster as Pobo (season 3), a floating canine alien and member of LoneSun's squad
- Clancy Brown as Cromus (season 3), an officer of the SilverCops, later revealed to be an undercover GoldCop
- Skyler Gisondo as:
  - Zylenol "Zy" Peehem (season 4), a bat-like alien who befriends Glen and member of the Holo Thieves
  - Gex (season 5), a SilverCop grunt during the war against the Equinites
- Gideon Adlon as Gragger (season 4), a squid-like alien and member of the Holo Thieves
- Algee Smith as Skunt (season 4), a hamster-like alien and member of the Holo Thieves
- Daveed Diggs as Skeletom (season 4), a skeletal hologram alien and leader of the Holo Thieves, later revealed to be working with the SilverCops
- Jack Quaid as Tomblr Crundle (season 5), a turkey-like alien who befriends Dodge and a trainee at the SilverCop bootcamp
- Chris Diamantopoulos as:
  - Zobert (season 5), an overconfident SilverCop trainee who bullies Tomblr
  - The GoldCop Boss (season 6), Dodge's commanding officer in the GoldCops
- Stephen Lang and Ron Funches as Sergeant Argent (season 5), the two-headed drill instructor at the SilverCop bootcamp
- Morgan Spector as Buttercup (season 5), the leader of the Equinite Resistance, a race of horse-like aliens whose planet is under invasion by the SilverCops
- Cree Summer as Portia (season 6), a car-like alien and Dodge's girlfriend
- Andy Cobb as the SilverCop Boss (season 6), the leader of a squad of SilverCops who are sent to Earth
- Jess Harnell as Glorpus (season 6), a pterosaur-like alien and member of the SilverCop squad sent to Earth
- Maribeth Monroe as Qeeflax (season 6), an insectoid alien and member of the SilverCop squad sent to Earth
- Debra Wilson as Bronkray (season 6), a member of the SilverCop squad sent to Earth

== Episodes ==
Season	Episodes	Originally released
1	8	May 8, 2020
2	8	March 26, 2021
2	Special	November 22, 2021
3	11	July 13, 2022
3	Special	October 3, 2022
4	11	August 14, 2023
4	Special	February 5, 2024
5	11	August 12, 2024
5	Special	October 7, 2024
6	10	October 13, 2025

== Production ==
=== Development ===
The series initially began development at Fox in 2015. On August 28, 2018, it was announced that Hulu had given the production a two-season order consisting of sixteen episodes. The series was created by Rick and Morty co-creator Justin Roiland and Mike McMahan, who also serve as executive producers. It is distributed by 20th Television. On June 18, 2020, Hulu renewed the series for an expanded third season consisting of eleven episodes. On June 22, 2021, Hulu renewed the series for a fourth season. On October 6, 2022, Hulu renewed the series for a fifth season. On July 26, 2024, Hulu renewed the series for a sixth season. In March 2025, the series was confirmed to end with the sixth season.

=== Writing ===
The Wall in Yumyulack's room where he imprisons shrunken-down people was, as Roiland has noted, one of the duo's initial ideas for the series, as they were interested in a "B-story" that lasted the entire first season.

=== Casting ===
Alongside the series first order announcement, it was confirmed that Roiland, Thomas Middleditch, Sean Giambrone, and Mary Mack would voice the lead characters in the series.

On January 25, 2023, Roiland was removed from the show, alongside sister show Koala Man, after he was charged with felony domestic abuse. Both shows are distributed by 20th Television, via their 20th Television Animation division. On June 20, 2023, it was announced that Dan Stevens was officially taking over as the voice of Korvo.

== Release ==
The first teaser for the series was released on March 25, 2020, and the first trailer on April 15, 2020. The first season premiered on May 8, 2020. Internationally, the series premiered on Disney+ under the dedicated streaming hub Star as an original series on February 23, 2021. The second season premiered on March 26, 2021.

The third season premiered on July 13, 2022. The fourth season premiered on August 14, 2023. The fifth season premiered on August 12, 2024. The sixth and final season premiered on October 13, 2025.

=== Syndication ===
The series premiered on FXX on July 30, 2022. In September 2025, the first five seasons were made available on Netflix.

== Reception ==
=== Viewership ===
Hulu announced that Solar Opposites became both the most-watched program and the most-watched Hulu Original comedy premiere on the platform following its debut from May 8—12, 2020. According to market research company Parrot Analytics, which looks at consumer engagement in consumer research, streaming, downloads, and on social media, the series was the second-largest gainer in global demand during the week of May 3—9, 2020. It saw a 326.7% spike in demand, making it one of the most popular new series at the time. Nielsen Media Research, which records streaming viewership on U.S. television screens, announced that the show ranked as the tenth most-streamed original series in the U.S. with 196 million minutes of watch time during the week of March 22–28, 2021. It rose to seventh place with 171 million minutes of watch time the following week, March 29–April 4, 2021. In April 2021, Solar Opposites experienced a 40.3% month-on-month increase in U.S. demand, according to Parrot Analytics.

Whip Media's viewership tracking app TV Time, which tracks viewership data for the more than 21 million worldwide users of its app, calculated that the series was the fourth most anticipated returning television series in July 2022. It ranked as the seventh most-streamed original series in the U.S. for the week of July 24, 2022. Nielsen Media Research further reported that it was the tenth most-streamed original series in the U.S. with 309 million minutes of watch time from of August 14—20, 2023. TVision, which utilizes its TVision Power Score to evaluate CTV programming performance by factoring in viewership and engagement across over 1,000 apps and incorporating four key metrics—viewer attention time, total program time available for the season, program reach, and app reach—calculated that Solar Opposites was the fifteenth most-streamed series from August 12—18, 2024. It subsequently moved to nineteenth place during the week of August 19–25, 2024. The series ranked No. 12 on Hulu's "Top 15 Today" list—a daily updated list of the platform's most-watched titles—on October 9, 2024.

=== Critical response ===
==== Season 1 ====
On Rotten Tomatoes, season 1 has an approval rating of 92% based on reviews from 37 critics, with an average rating of 7.60/10. The website's critical consensus states, "Charming, hilarious, and surprisingly sincere, Solar Opposites revels in the ridiculousness of life while finding a few fresh things to say about humanity along the way." On Metacritic it has a weighted average score of 72 out of 100, based on reviews from 10 critics, indicating "generally favorable reviews".

Dan Fienberg of The Hollywood Reporter praised the animation of the series, acclaimed the performances of the voice actors, and complimented the humor of the show, writing, "Justin Roiland and Mike McMahan's new Hulu animated comedy Solar Opposites has enough loopy sci-fi elements to appeal to Rick and Morty fans and a distinctly adult sensibility." Alison Foreman of Mashable praised the dynamic and strong relationships between the different characters, drawing comparisons with other families coming from adult animated sitcoms such as The Simpsons while complimenting the humor of the show, calling it a "spectacular gem worthy of its own fanbase." Joe Matar of Den of Geek rated the series 5 out of 5 stars, praised the show for its classic sitcom format, acclaimed the performances of the voice actors, and applauded the comicality, stating that despite the comparisons with Rick and Morty, the series manages to stand on its own. Alex McLevy of The A.V. Club gave the show a B grade and called it "a mischievous cousin of 3rd Rock from the Sun" while saying it doesn't stray too far from the template Roiland set with Rick and Morty. McLevy feels the show is still finding its feet, but "Luckily, the humor is so reliably strong, the pacing so breakneck as it races from one plot to the next, that it's hard not to be won over by Solar Opposites' avalanche of charm." Joyce Slaton of Common Sense Media rated Solar Opposites 3 out of 5 stars, writing, "Solar Opposites is an animated show by the brains behind Rick and Morty. It has the same style and vibe, including lots of edgy humor, cheerful gory violence, surreal visuals and plot twists, and wall-to-wall language."

==== Season 2 ====
On Rotten Tomatoes, the second season has an approval rating of 100% based on reviews from 14 critics, with an average rating of 8.10/10. The website's critical consensus states, "Solar Opposites successfully shoots for the moon in an ambitious sophomore outing that manages to build on the first season while adding plenty of fun surprises."

Jess Joho of Mashable found that the second season gives Solar Opposites its own identity, writing, "Roiland and other Ricky and Morty talent finally releasing themselves from the creative shackles of what works for that show, to find their own uniquely satisfying rhythm." Joe Matar of Den of Geek rated the second season 5 out of 5 stars, found it to be a "bigger, crazier, and funnier" season compared to the first one, and gave praise for its cursed language, references to pop culture, and level of violence depicted across its episodes. Davis Opie of Digital Spy rated the second season of the series 4 out of 5 stars, stating, "Everything that worked in season one is intensified here for the better," and claimed that Solar Opposites manages to be distinct from Rick and Morty across its humor and story lines, saying, "Solar Opposites is very much its own beast." Ethan Anderson of SlashFilm gave the second season a grade of 8 out of 10, stated it brings back the humor of the first season with a dark storytelling, and claimed it manages to be "bigger, crazier, and even more confident" than the first season.

==== Season 3 ====
On Rotten Tomatoes, the third season has an approval rating of 100% based on reviews from 7 critics, with an average rating of 8/10.

Lex Briscuso of SlashFilm called the third season of Solar Opposites "bright, bold, and, frankly, bananas in the best way," writing, "Solar Opposites has established itself as a spicy animated situational comedy that pulls from the best parts of its predecessor, Rick and Morty, yet doesn't get stuck looking for its place outside of the Adult Swim hit's shadow. The show is self-assured with a unique vibe and tone all its own, and that continues to shine in the third season. By leaning into the more human elements of what the series has to offer — both the base exploration of those concepts with the aliens and the desperate attempt at a reclamation from the wall people — season 3 of Solar Opposites reminds us that clever structure can give way to everything else you love about a story: clever writing, brash jokes, and pure cathartic connective tissue." Anthony Orlando of BuzzFeed ranked Solar Opposites 10th in their "17 Shows And Characters That Absolutely, Positively Should Have Received Emmy Nominations," saying, "Sure, this show may not be as good as Rick and Morty, but Solar Opposites is very much its own comedic beast. Co-creator Justin Roiland and his team inject the same amount of hilarity and creativity into this alien-centric show as he did with the former series. Also, the side-adventures in The Wall should've garnered some nominations by themselves, as they made for an outstanding show within the show."

==== Season 4 ====
On Rotten Tomatoes, the fourth season has an approval rating of 100% based on reviews from 8 critics, with an average rating of 7.8/10.

Ross McIndoe of Slant Magazine called the fourth season of Solar Opposites "a mad blend of pop-cultural references and meta-gags, some of which land and some of which don't," also adding that season four is "true to the scatological, self-awareness of the show's prior ones." Nate Richard of Collider has called season four "the series' most entertaining to date" and "one of the better original comedy series that Hulu has to offer," though the show "start to get repetitive at points". Praising Dan Stevens voice replacing Justin Roiland's, Tessa Smith of Mama's Geeky wrote, "Dan Stevens steps in without missing a beat as the voice of Korvo."

=== Accolades ===
Year	Award	Category	Recipient(s)	Result	Ref.
2021	Clio Awards	Audio/Visual Social Single Video	Solar Opposites	Bronze	
2022	BMI Film & TV Awards	BMI Streaming Series Awards	Chris Westlake	Won	
2022	Clio Awards	Special Event	Solar Opposites	Gold	
2024	Annie Awards	Outstanding Achievement for Voice Acting in an Animated Television/Media Production	Dan Stevens	Nominated	
2025	Annie Awards	Best Animated Television/Media Production for Mature Audience	Solar Opposites	Nominated	

== Merchandise ==
On January 27, 2021, it was revealed at the 2021 Funko Fair that new figures based on the series would be made, which were released on June 25, 2021. On November 17, 2021, Hulu launched an online storefront which featured merchandise based on select shows from its service, with Solar Opposites being one of them.

On July 22, 2022, an announcement was made at San Diego Comic-Con that a 192-page art book titled "The Art of Solar Opposites" would be released in early 2023 for $49.99 and will be published by Dark Horse Books. However, as of September 2024, the book has not been released.

== Tie-in media ==
=== Music video ===
A music video, titled "WTF is Christmas? (A Solar Opposites Song ft. Darren Criss)" and written by Tony Ferrari, was released on November 11, 2021, where Korvo tries to remember what Christmas is all about.

=== Video game ===
Solar Opposites were featured character players in the crossover racing game Warped Kart Racers, released to Apple Arcade in May 2022, along with characters from Family Guy, American Dad!, and King of the Hill.
