= Eleanor Amplified =

Children's podcast

The Radio Adventures of Eleanor Amplified is a children's podcast produced by WHYY.

== Background ==
The show follows a radio reporter named Eleanor during her investigations. The show has released three seasons. The podcast was produced by WHYY. The show was created by John Sheehan who is the producer of Fresh Air. Common Sense Media gave the show a three star rating for children ages eight and older. The show debuted in the summer of 2016. The podcast was adapted into a book titled Eleanor Amplified and the Trouble with Mind Control. The show held the #1 spot on the iTunes charts in the Kids and Family category for five weeks. Emma Dibdin wrote in The New York Times that the show has "thrilling world-building". Melissa Locker compared the show to Little Orphan Annie and included the show in The Guardian's list of the best podcasts of 2016.

== Episodes ==
Forty-two episodes, several extras, and a two-part live show were released over four seasons running from 2016 to 2020. Additionally, each complete season was released as a Road Trip Edition podcast.

Episode	Title	Air Date	Notes
Ep 00	Who is… Eleanor Amplified!?	June 15, 2016	Trailer: Introducing Eleanor Amplified!
Ep 01	Pilot (Robot)	June 29, 2016	
Ep 02	The Bonnie Lass	June 29, 2016	
Ep 03	Kale Salad	July 6, 2016	
	Terry Gross introduces Eleanor Amplified	July 6, 2016	
Ep 04	The Couquitahwah	July 13, 2016	
Ep 05	It’s Breakfast Time, America	July 20, 2016	
Ep 06	Antique Armoire	July 27, 2016	
Ep 07	Maggie	August 3, 2016	
Ep 08	The Rook	August 10, 2016	
Ep 09	Megablurg HQ pt 1	August 17, 2016	
Ep 10	Megablurg HQ pt 2	August 24, 2016	
Road Trip Edition	Vol. 1	November 17, 2016	The complete first season
Ep 11	The Big Rhombus	June 12, 2017	
Ep 12	Eleanor and the Amplifiers	June 12, 2017	
Ep 13	Gary the IT Guy	August 30, 2017	
Ep 14	The Tired Squib	August 30, 2017	
Ep 15	Axolotl’s Amulet	August 30, 2017	
Ep 16	Bridget Starlight	September 13, 2017	
Ep 17	The Grand Griffith	September 13, 2017	
Ep 18	The Fishy Pickle	September 13, 2017	
Ep 19	Her Old Kentucky Home	September 27, 2017	
Ep 20	Faceblurg	September 27, 2017	
Ep 21	The Gym is Neutral Territory	September 27, 2017	
Live Special	Operation Amazon	May 23, 2018	Recorded on April 28th, 2018
Live Special	Part 2, Q & A	May 23, 2018	The cast and creator of Eleanor Amplified take questions from the audience.Recorded on April 28th, 2018
Ep 22	Unicon	June 13, 2018	
Ep 23	Mindless Meditation	June 20, 2018	
Ep 24	The Island’s Secret	June 27, 2018	
Ep 25	The Dusty Mongrel	July 11, 2018	
Ep 26	Big Palooka	July 18, 2018	
Ep 27	Terrifying H.U.M.M.U.S.	July 25, 2018	
Ep 28	Natural Disaster Preparedness	August 1, 2018	
Ep 29	The Cnidarian Society	August 8, 2018	
Ep 30	Escape from Exeor’s Maze	August 15, 2018	
Ep 31	OGN News	August 22, 2018	
Road Trip Edition	Vol. 2	November 7, 2018	
Road Trip Edition	Vol. 3	November 14, 2018	
Extra	S4 Sneak Peek Shhh…	June 24, 2019	
Ep 32	Lions of the Sea	February 26, 2020	
Ep 33	FlogDaar is the Future	March 4, 2020	
Ep 34	123 Science Street	March 11, 2020	
Ep 35	SMASH HARDSTONE	March 18, 2020	
Ep 36	The Spanferkel	March 25, 2020	
Extra	The Stay at Home Special!	April 9, 2020	
Ep 37	Don’t Goat Me, Man	June 17, 2020	
Ep 38	Luck and Jogging	June 24, 2020	
Ep 39	The New Protocol	July 1, 2020	
Ep 40	Rockets and Laser Beams	July 8, 2020	
Ep 41	The Final Episode	July 15, 2020	
Ep 42	Psych!	July 22, 2020	
Road Trip Edition	Vol. 4	September 23, 2020	
Extra	A Special Announcement	September 20, 2021	
