= Josh Bycel =

American television writer and producer

Josh Bycel is a television writer/producer. He has worked on such shows as Veronica's Closet, It's All Relative, Andy Barker P.I., and American Dad!. He was hired as the executive producer and co-showrunner (along with Bill Lawrence) for the ninth season of Scrubs. He was most recently a writer and executive producer on Happy Endings, The Big Show Show, and Solar Opposites. Bycel once wrote column for The Huffington Post in 2016.

== Writer ==
- 2020: Solar Opposites (writer/executive producer)
  - The Booster Manifold
  - The Lake House Device
  - The Solar Opposites Almost Get An Xbox
  - The Gargoyle Ray
  - The Fog of Pupa
- 2020: The Big Show Show (writer/executive producer)
  - Prototype
  - The Big Brain
- 2018: LA to Vegas (writer)
  - Things to Do in Vegas When You're Grounded
- 2011–13: Happy Endings (writer/executive producer)
  - Sabado Free-Gante
  - Four Weddings and a Funeral (Minus Three Weddings and One Funeral
  - The Code War
  - Blax, Snake, Home
  - Your Couples Friends & Neighbors
  - The Quicksand Girlfriend
- 2009–10: Scrubs (co-head writer/showrunner) (season 9)
  - Our Drunken Friend
- The Guy's Manual (TV pilot) (creator)
- 2007–09: Psych
  - Any Given Friday Night at 10PM, 9PM Central
  - The Greatest Adventure in the History of Basic Cable
  - There's Something About Mira
  - And Down the Stretch Comes Murder
- 2006–07: American Dad!
  - The Vacation Goo
  - Camp Refoogee
- 2007: Andy Barker, P.I.
  - The Big No Sleep
- 2006: The 78th Annual Academy Awards - contributing writer
- 2004: Father of the Pride
- 2003–04. It's All Relative
  - Who's Camping Now
  - Swangate
  - Take Me Out
- 2003:Kid Notorious
  - The F-You Soup
- 2002:Do Over
  - Star Search
- 2000: Bette
  - I Love This Game
  - In My Life
- 1998–99: Veronica's Closet
  - Veronica's Sliding Doors
  - Veronica Plays House
  - Veronica's Great Model Search

== Producer ==
- 20. The Big Show Show - executive producer
- 11-12. Happy Endings - co-executive producer
- 09-10. Scrubs - executive producer/co-showrunner (season 9)
- The Guy's Manual - executive producer
- 07-09. Psych - co-executive producer (season 3)/supervising producer (season 2)
- 06-07. American Dad! - supervising producer
- 07 Andy Barker P.I. - consulting producer
- 03-04. It's All Relative - producer
- 03. Kid Notorious - consulting producer
- 02. Do Over - co-producer
- 00. Bette - co-producer
