= Shahadi Wright Joseph =

American actress, singer, and dancer (born 2005)

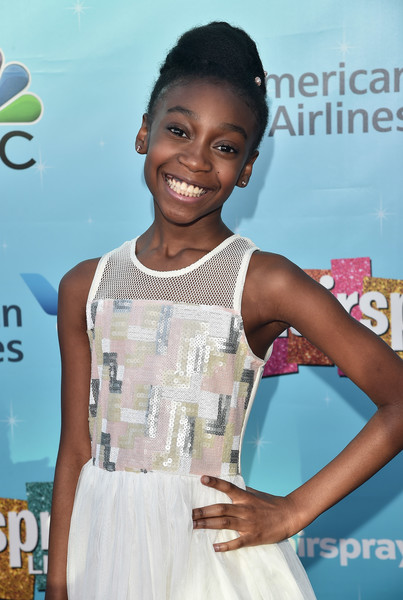
- Joseph at the Hairspray Live! event in 2016.
- Born: April 29, 2005 (age 21); New York City, U.S.
- Occupations: Actress; singer; dancer
- Years active: 2013–present

Shahadi Wright Joseph (born April 29, 2005) is an American actress, singer, and dancer. She is best known for her starring role in Jordan Peele's horror film Us (2019), the voice for Young Nala in Jon Favreau's musical film The Lion King (2019), as Ruby Lee Emory in the Amazon Prime original series Them (TV series) and Holiday Anders in the podcast, "Six Minutes".

== Early life ==
Joseph was born and raised in East New York, Brooklyn, New York City. She has been dancing since the age of two. She once auditioned for a school play in third grade using Lupita Nyong'o's Academy Award acceptance speech.

== Career ==
Joseph's first major acting role came when she was cast as young Nala in the Broadway musical adaptation The Lion King, at nine years old. Joseph appeared as Madison, an original cast member in Andrew Lloyd Webber's musical adaptation School of Rock. In 2016, she appeared as Little Inez Stubbs in the NBC musical television special Hairspray Live!, which earned positive reviews.

In 2018, she began starring in the podcast Six Minutes. She plays the lead, Holiday.

In November 2017, it was announced Joseph would reprise her role as young Nala in the 2019 remake of The Lion King, directed by Jon Favreau. She chose to work on the film because she sees the character as a role model who inspires young girls. Upon learning that Beyoncé would be voicing grown-up Nala, Joseph stated that she was motivated to work harder and consider how Beyoncé would approach the role.

Also in 2019, Joseph starred in the supernatural horror film Us, which was directed by Jordan Peele. She read for the dual role of Zora and Umbrae three times before being offered the part. The film earned critical acclaim and was a box office success. Her performance earned her numerous award nominations, including for a Saturn Award and a Critics' Choice Movie Award.

Joseph had a starring role as Ruby Lee Emory in the Amazon Prime Video horror drama series Them. The series was released in April 2021, to generally positive reviews.

== Filmography ==
=== Film ===
| Year | Title | Role | Notes |
|---|---|---|---|
| 2019 | Us | Zora Wilson / Umbrae | see awards |
| 2019 | The Lion King | Young Nala (voice) | |
| TBA | Altar | TBA | |
| TBA | Cookbook for Southern Housewives | Ruby | |

=== Television ===
| Year | Title | Role | Notes |
|---|---|---|---|
| 2016 | Hairspray Live! | Little Inez Stubbs | Television special |
| 2021, 2024 | Them | Ruby Lee Emory | 11 episodes |

== Awards and nominations ==
Solo Awards for Shahadi Wright Joseph
| Year | Award | Category | Work | Result | Ref |
|---|---|---|---|---|---|
| 2019 | Saturn Awards | Best Performance by a Younger Actor | Us | Nominated | |
| 2019 | Washington D.C. Area Film Critics Association | Best Youth Performance | Us | Nominated | |
| 2020 | Black Reel Awards | Outstanding Supporting Actress | Us | Nominated | |
| 2020 | Black Reel Awards | Breakthrough Performance - Female | Us | Nominated | |
| 2020 | Critics' Choice Movie Awards | Best Young Actor/Actress | Us | Nominated | |
| 2020 | Music City Film Critics Association | Best Young Actress | Us | Nominated | |
| 2020 | NAACP Image Awards | Breakthrough Role - Motion Picture | Us | Nominated | |
| 2020 | Online Film & Television Association | Best Youth Performance | Us | Nominated | |

Other Awards for Shahadi Wright Joseph
| Year | Award | Category | Work | Result | Ref |
|---|---|---|---|---|---|
| 2020 | Hollywood Critics Association | Next Generation of Hollywood | Herself | Won | |
