= Politically Re-Active =

American political and comedy podcast

Politically Re-Active with W. Kamau Bell and Hari Kondabolu
- Genre: Politics

Cast and voices
- Hosted by: W. Kamau Bell; Hari Kondabolu

Publication
- Original release: 2016
- Provider: Panoply Media (seasons 1–2); Topic Studios (season 3)
- Updates: Weekly

Related
- Website: www.politicallyreactive.com

Politically Re-Active is a political comedy podcast hosted by comedians W. Kamau Bell and Hari Kondabolu. The left-leaning show, organized around guest interviews, launched in June 2016 and initially focused on the 2016 United States presidential election, but continued through October 2017. After a hiatus, it resumed in October 2020.

== History ==
Bell and Kondabolu previously worked together on Totally Biased with W. Kamau Bell, with Bell hosting and Kondabolu serving as writer and correspondent. The show grew out of conversations the two hosts were having by telephone and backstage at shows over the course of their careers as stand-up comedians.

The first two seasons of Politically Re-Active were produced by First Look Media in collaboration with Slate's podcasting division, Panoply. The show was First Look Media's first podcast. The third season was produced by Topic Studios and WarnerMedia Podcast Network.

== Schedule ==
The podcast debuted in June 2016. Early episodes focused on the U.S. presidential campaign of 2016, with weekly episodes from June through the election in November. Politically Re-Active aired two post-election episodes in November 2016, then went on hiatus. Season 2 began on March 15, 2017, and ended on October 5, 2017. The show's third season debuted on October 5, 2020.

== Format ==
The show consists of interviews and political comedy. Bell and Kondabolu "host (typically left-leaning) guests each week to try to understand the different ideologies that are shaping this election." Wired described Politically Reactive as "mostly reasonable discussions with guests." Topics of discussion have included dog-whistling, private prisons, presidential debates and the Olympics. Interviews are edited to insert occasional explanations from Bell and Kondabolu (introduced by Kondabolu saying, "Hold up, wait a minute!") to give additional context.

== Reception ==
ColorLines called it a "hilarious new politics podcast" and The Guardian said of the debut, "Bell and Kondabolu are two of the sharpest, funniest political minds around, and based on the first episode, Politically Re-Active will be a great addition to the podcast roster." In July The A.V. Club said the series had "start[ed] off strong," particularly praising the interview with Kathleen Hanna: "an altogether enjoyable episode that's also a nice primer on both feminism and mansplaining. If the first three episodes are any indication, Bell and Kondabolu are going to be a podcasting force to be reckoned with." AlterNet called it "a seriously great podcast series...easily one of the most binge-worthy things I've listened to in recent memory, and already a runaway hit."

In the first six episodes, Politically Re-Active made iTunes' top 15 chart.

== Episodes ==
=== Season 1 ===
Date	Title
June 9, 2016	Introducing Politically Re-Active
June 28, 2016	Dog Whistling with Ian Haney López
June 30, 2016	Private Prisons with Shane Bauer
July 6, 2016	Kathleen Hanna on 3rd Wave Feminism & Why She's "With Her"
July 13, 2016	Pastor Michael McBride Says Stop Reaching for Whiteness
July 14, 2016	Robert Reich on Min. Wage, the Bern, & His Date with Hillary
July 20, 2016	Pramila Jayapal on Majority Minority Districts & Teaching Hari How to Dress Himself
July 27, 2016	Democracy Now's Amy Goodman Gives Us the Election Unfiltered
August 3, 2016	How Van Jones Keeps His Cool in the Cable News Circus
August 10, 2016	dream hampton on Black Liberation in the Hour of Chaos
August 17, 2016	David Daley on How Republicans Ratf**ked American Democracy
August 24, 2016	Dave Zirin on Loving and Hating the Olympics
August 30, 2016	Lindy West on Seeing Women as Real People
September 7, 2016	Shaun King on Controversy, Color, and Kaepernick
September 14, 2016	Jasiri X: Hip Hop and the Movement
September 15, 2016	BONUS EPISODE: NoDAPL, Mailbag, & Our Old Pal Adam Mansbach
September 21, 2016	Presidential Debate Tailgate with John Dickerson
September 28, 2016	Rachel Maddow on Donald Trump, Dick Cheney, and River Monsters
October 5, 2016	Rosa Clemente on Third Parties in a Broken System
October 12, 2016	Comedian Zahra Noorbakhsh & Chicano Band Las Cafeteras
October 19, 2016	S. E. Cupp on being an Anti-Trump Conservative
October 26, 2016	Dr. Jill Stein on Investing Your Vote
November 2, 2016	Comedian Hasan Minhaj on New Brown America and His Superpowers
November 8, 2016	Voting Day Update about This Week's Show!
November 10, 2016	Roxane Gay on Anger after the Election
November 17, 2016	Facing the Future with CNN's Jake Tapper
November 23, 2016	Presenting Maeve in America

=== Season 2 ===
Date	Title
March 15, 2017	Season Two?
March 29, 2017	Patrisse Khan-Cullors on Black Lives Matter & Resistance Under 45
April 5, 2017	YouTube's Akilah Hughes on #BlackWomenAtWork & Feeding the Buzz
April 12, 2017	Journalist Alia Malik on What We're Missing When We Talk About Syria
April 19, 2017	Michael Skolnik on Being a White Woke Guy
April 27, 2017	Aasif Mandvi on the Gaslighting Presidency
May 4, 2017	Getting Adversarial with Journalist Jeremy Scahill
May 11, 2017	Political Analyst Angela Rye Calls It Like It Is
May 18, 2017	Kate Schatz and Miriam Klein Stahl on Rad American Women
May 25, 2017	Rashad Robinson & Color of Change Cancels Bill O'Reilly
June 1, 2017	Jill Filipovic on the Feminist Pursuit of Happiness
June 8, 2017	Comedy in the Trump Era: 3 Comedians, a Professor, and Kamau's Mom
June 15, 2017	Naomi Klein Says "No Is Not Enough"
June 22, 2017	Janet Mock on Surpassing Certainty
July 6, 2017	BONUS! Phoebe Robinson, Lindy West, Shane Bauer-Live at Clusterfest
July 13, 2017	Street Heat w/ Congresswoman Barbara Lee & Linda Sarsour
July 20, 2017	Hold Up, Wait a Minute: Twitter Feuds & Threat Models
July 27, 2017	Killer Mike of Run the Jewels on Allyship, Equity, and Apocalypse Preparation
August 3, 2017	Lewis Black, legendary political comedian is so angry, he won't even talk about 'you know who'. Now THAT'S angry!
August 10, 2017	Is this what democracy looks like? Jake Tapper & Jessica Byrd give their take
August 17, 2017	Charlottesville: Why did this happen and how do we move forward?
August 19, 2017	Bonus! Listeners respond to Charlottesville
August 24, 2017	Smashing the Confederacy in the streets and on the screen
August 31, 2017	Roy Wood Jr. and Franchesca Ramsey fighting trolls with truth and satire
September 7, 2017	Disaster Capitalism and How To Fight It, with Dr. Keeanga-Yamahtta Taylor and Mustafa Santiago Ali
September 14, 2017	Speaking with bell hooks and talking DACA
September 21. 2017	Neil de Grasse Tyson brings the universe down to Earth
September 28, 2017	Writing for very smart brothas (including President Obama)
October 5, 2017	What did we learn? With Alicia Garza and Wyatt Cenac

=== Season 3 ===
Date	Title
October 5, 2020	Catching up with Kamau & Hari
October 7, 2020	The Four-Letter Word for 2020? Hope (with Alexandra Rojas and Desmond Meade)
October 14, 2020	Insiders + Insurgents with Jon Lovett and Cori Bush
October 21, 2020	Maria Hinojosa + The Case for Court-Packing
October 28, 2020	Katie Porter! + Caroline Giuliani + Hari's Dad
November 4, 2020	Election Re-Action with Alicia Garza
November 11, 2020	Phoebe Robinson + The Electoral College's Slaveholder Math
November 18, 2020	Sarah Cooper + Dr. Peter Hotez
December 2, 2020	Ijeoma Oluo + Sarah Silverman
December 9, 2020	The Georgia Episode with LaTosha Brown
December 16, 2020	Daveed Diggs
January 6, 2021	Georgia! + What the hell?
January 13, 2021	Defund the Police 2021 + Trump's Twitter

== See also ==
- Political podcast
