= Walter Bell =

Walter Bell may refer to:

- Walter A. Bell (1889–1969), Canadian geologist
- Walter Bell (businessman), American businessman
- W. Kamau Bell (Walter Kamau Bell, born 1973), American stand-up comic and television host
- W. D. M. Bell (Walter Dalrymple Maitland Bell, 1880–1951), Scottish adventurer
- Walter Leonard Bell (1865–1932), Scottish surgeon and antiquarian
- Walter Bell (diplomat) (1909–2004), British diplomat and intelligence officer
- Walt Bell, American college football coach and player
