= Denzel Washington Is the Greatest Actor of All Time Period =

Podcast about Denzel Washington

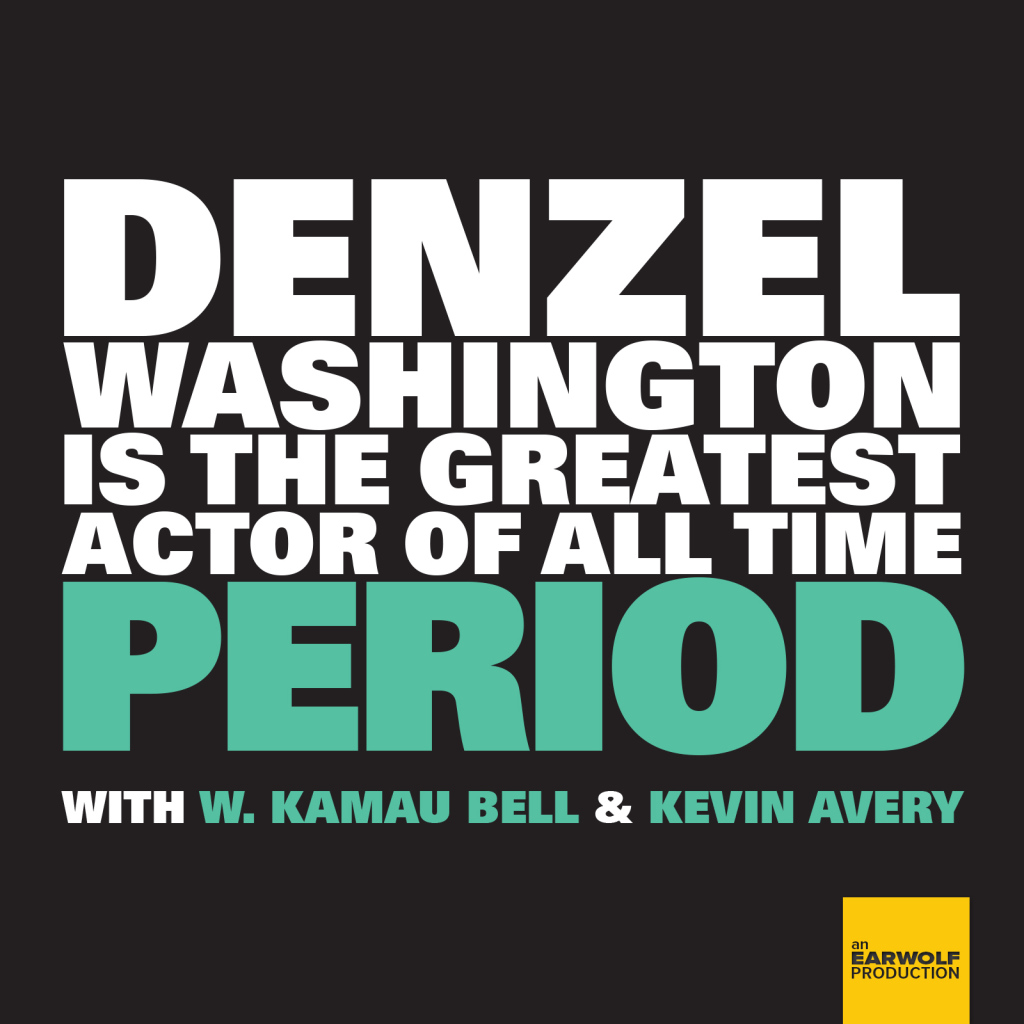
- Genre: Film criticism, Comedy, Interview
- Language: English

Cast and voices
- Hosted by: W. Kamau Bell, Kevin Avery

Production
- Length: 40–90 minutes

Publication
- Original release: November 2, 2014; 11 years ago
- Provider: Earwolf

Related
- Website: www.earwolf.com/show/denzel-washington/

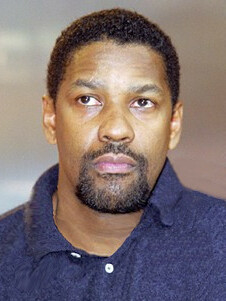

Denzel Washington Is the Greatest Actor of All Time Period, sometimes abbreviated to DWITGAOATP, is a weekly podcast co-hosted by W. Kamau Bell and Kevin Avery. Designed to highlight and canonize the career and cultural significance of actor Denzel Washington, the show reviews each of his films, discusses "Denzel news," and interviews filmmakers associated with and inspired by his work. As the show has evolved, it has also expanded to include discussions on the state of black film and diversity in media. The show is produced by Earwolf.

== Background ==
Co-hosts Avery and Bell first met as stand-up comics in the San Francisco Bay Area, and Avery would later serve as the head writer for Totally Biased with W. Kamau Bell. They had frequently connected over their shared fandom of Denzel Washington films, which led to the concept of the podcast being created when both comedians were searching for new projects after the cancelation of Totally Biased.

Bell explained the motivation for creating the podcast as follows:

I think the great thing about this podcast is, even if people don't think he's the greatest actor of all time—first of all, they'd be wrong—you'd totally get why somebody would be excited about Denzel Washington. He's like black Santa Claus, like he'd walk into the room and everybody gets excited. He's just one of those dudes. There are other actors like that, but I think as a black actor, it says something more about him and his place in history. And, also, he's very aware of his place in history. So, I think that's the other thing, too. He's an actor who's aware that he's a part of the history of black Hollywood, and he has to take care of his place, because who knows who's coming after him?

— "W. Kamau Bell on Baltimore, Ferguson, and Why Denzel Washington Is the Greatest", Esquire, April 30, 2015

The first episode of the show was released on November 2, 2014, and new episodes are generally released on Thursdays. The initial goal was to review Washington's films in mostly alphabetical order, although in practice guest hosts and topical conversations have resulted in that order being changed many times.

Beyond focusing on Washington's career alone, the podcast has also expanded to include discussions on the role of black actors and filmmakers in Hollywood and in media in general. Bell explained in an interview how the premise of the show connects with this added focus: "There's stuff about how hard it is to be a working black actress in Hollywood, because you see [Denzel] and where are all these black actresses that you see in one movie? Why aren't they working more? So we end up bleeding into other issues."

== Format ==
=== Reviews and ratings ===
Bell, Avery, and guest hosts all provide a rating on a 1 to 5 star-rating scale for each film reviewed. The ratings system is based on a speech from the movie Malcolm X, as follows: "Been Took" (1), "Led Astray" (2), "Hoodwinked" (3), "Run Amok" (4), and "Bamboozled" (5). Occasionally, a 6-star rating of "This is what he does!", created based on a fan suggestion, is also given. As of June 2016, the average ratings given by Bell and Avery are 3.45 and 3.83 respectively, while guests have collectively given an average rating of 4.43.

=== Interviews and guests ===
The show has featured several comedians, actors, and filmmakers as guest hosts. It also features interviews with actors and filmmakers who have collaborated with Washington as well as other notable figures in black film and media. Guests are generally asked to list their top 5 favorite Denzel Washington films, in order. A guest choosing more than five films for their list known as "Cooglering", as guest Ryan Coogler did so by including multiple films tied for one spot. Notable interviewees and guest hosts include:

- Omar Dorsey, actor.
- J. August Richards, actor.
- Ava DuVernay, director, who discussed her work, race and gender in the film industry, as well as reviewing a film.
- Hari Kondabolu, comedian.
- Spike Lee, director who has collaborated with Washington in Mo' Better Blues, Devil in a Blue Dress, Malcolm X, and Inside Man. The two-part episode included discussion of Lee's experiences working with Washington, the history and current status of black filmmakers in Hollywood, and the role of black film critics.
- Ryan Coogler and Aaron Covington, director and writer of Creed.
- David Alan Grier, actor and comedian, who discussed his role in The Wiz.
- Sonari Glinton, radio host and journalist.
- India Arie, singer.
- Jerrika Hinton, actor and co-star of Grey's Anatomy, who discussed an episode of the show directed by Washington.
- Issa Rae, actor and writer.
- Jesse Williams, actor and co-star of Grey's Anatomy.
- Sterling K. Brown, actor, who discussed his role in The People v. O. J. Simpson: American Crime Story.
- Gary Whitta, writer of The Book of Eli.
- Cassandra Freeman, actor and co-star of Inside Man.
- Terry Gross, radio host.
- Touré, journalist and music critic.

== Recurring themes and lore ==
=== Denzelishness ===
Some of the common characteristics and features of Denzel Washington characters are described in the podcast as components of "Denzelishness." These include: the Denzel walk ("sideways stroll with the confidence of a man who just had a shot of tequila"), Denzel humor, the Denzel lip, unaffected badassery, and the Glory tear (referring to an iconic scene where Washington's character cries a single tear in that film).

=== Periodization of Washington's career ===
In the show, Avery and Bell periodize Washington's films into four distinct phases: the Glory Era, the He Got Game Era, the Man on Fire Era, and the Old Man Action Era. The last is the current era of his filmography, and includes such films as The Taking of Pelham 123 (2009), The Book of Eli (2010), Safe House (2012), and The Equalizer (2014).

== Fan community ==
Fans of the podcast are known as "Denzealots", and several have appeared as guest hosts or interviewees on the show. The Denzealots.com webpage and Twitter account are both created and maintained by fans (Igor Rusinov and Liz respectively, who have both been interviewed on the show). Fans also regularly participate in conversation with Bell, Avery, and each other on Twitter, and create various memes associated with jokes and themes from the show.

== Reception ==
The podcast debuted at No. 81 on the iTunes US podcast charts, and reached No. 57 the subsequent week. In November 2015, it was selected as one of "Ten Podcasts Every Black Woman Should Hear" by Essence magazine. It was also selected as a "must-listen" podcast by The Offing magazine.

The A.V. Club's recurring Podmass feature has highlighted the show five times in its best-podcasts-of-the-week column between 2014 and 2016, for episodes featuring a review of A Soldier's Story, an interview with David Alan Grier about A Soldier's Play, a review of Mo' Better Blues with guest Ava DuVernay, a two-part interview with Spike Lee, and a discussion of an article on "The Black Film Canon" with Slate writers Aisha Harris and Dan Kois.

Bell and Avery were highlighted in a list of innovative podcasters by Fast Company in February 2015.
