= Bruce Campbell (disambiguation) =

Bruce Campbell (born 1958) is an American actor.

Bruce Campbell may also refer to:

- Bruce Campbell (Alberta politician) (1923–2011), Edmonton city alderman
- Bruce Campbell (gridiron football) (born 1988), American football offensive tackle
- Bruce Campbell (Australian footballer) (1890–1964), Australian rules footballer
- Bruce Campbell (barrister) (1916–1990), New Zealand-born British barrister and politician
- Bruce Campbell (baseball) (1909–1995), American baseball player
- Bruce Campbell (historian) (born 1949), British economic historian
- Bruce Campbell (ornithologist) (1912–1993), British ornithologist and writer
- Bruce Atta Campbell (1888–1954), British Army officer
- Bruce Campbell, involved in the founding of Hulu
- Jobriath (1946–1983), American musician born Bruce Wayne Campbell

== See also ==
- Ronald Bruce Campbell, a British Army officer and Olympic fencer
- Bruce Campbell Field, an airport southeast of the central business district of Madison, Mississippi
- Bruce Campbell Hopper, a World War I aviator, newspaper reporter, author, historian, and lecturer
- Bruce Campbell Shelley, an American board and video game designer
