= Waiting for 2042 =

Live album by Hari Kondabolu
- Released: March 2014
- Genre: Stand-up comedy
- Label: Kill Rock Stars

Waiting for 2042 is the 2014 debut comedy album by stand-up comedian Hari Kondabolu. The album deals largely with the theme of civil rights and discrimination, mainly racism and race relations in the United States. It also touches on LGBTQ+ rights, feminism, and environmentalism.

== Background ==
The album title refers to the year 2042 when white Americans may be a statistical minority in the United States.

Kondabolu recorded the album at a live performance on July 16, 2013 at the New Parish in Oakland, CA, but did not have time to edit and release it until after his job with Totally Biased With W. Kamau Bell ended due to network cancellation. The album was released in March 2014 on Kill Rock Stars.

== Critical reception ==
Vish Khanna of Exclaim! called Waiting for 2042 the best comedy album of 2014, describing Kondabolu as a "truly world-class observational comic with an uncommonly rich knowledge of pop culture" and noting, "his riff on Weezer is less a respite than a meditation on how selfishly we consume the artists we love". Paste Magazine listed Waiting for 2042 among the ten best comedy albums or specials of the first half of 2014, categorizing Kondabolu among comedians who find "that perfect middle ground between proselytizing and plain ol’ joking" and "offer up their material with an acid tongue and a fire in their belly". The Portland Mercury called Waiting for 2042 a "blisteringly good comedy album":

But Kondabolu's chops as a writer go far beyond topical humor: This set is full of elegantly structured premises, subtle callbacks, and a quizzical self-referentiality that constantly tests the assumptions that underpin the material. The marriage of careful joke structure and fiercely intelligent commentary elevates this album from a collection of solid progressive punchlines to a work of art.

Jason Zinoman, writing for The New York Times, said, "Mr. Kondabolu builds jokes through arguments, articulating opposing views, dramatizing disputes, then slicing through them with his own progressive take." Zinoman observed that Kondabolu's material was in "wonkier territory" than most comics, but served up in a "traditional and audience-friendly" style.

== Track list ==
No.	Title	Length
1.	"My White Chocolate Joke"	04:59
2.	"A Feminist Dick Joke"	01:53
3.	"Moving to Canada"	02:28
4.	"My Healthcare Plan"	03:26
5.	"Environmentally Friendly Pollution Machines"	01:46
6.	"Toby"	03:49
7.	"Weezer Broke My Heart"	04:28
8.	"Asians Are Well-Behaved"	02:05
9.	"2042 & the White Minority"	03:22
10.	"Mexican Stereotypes"	01:13
11.	"When in Rome"	02:19
12.	"Homosexuality Is Natural"	02:20
13.	"Flamboyant Heterosexuals"	02:12
14.	"Matthew McConaughey on Tolerance"	07:42
15.	"Brown Doc Brown & the Prophet Marty McFly"	04:14
16.	"Breastfeeding"	01:59
17.	"Chess"	02:33
18.	"List of Roles I'd Be Perfect For"	03:46
