= Zahra Noorbakhsh =

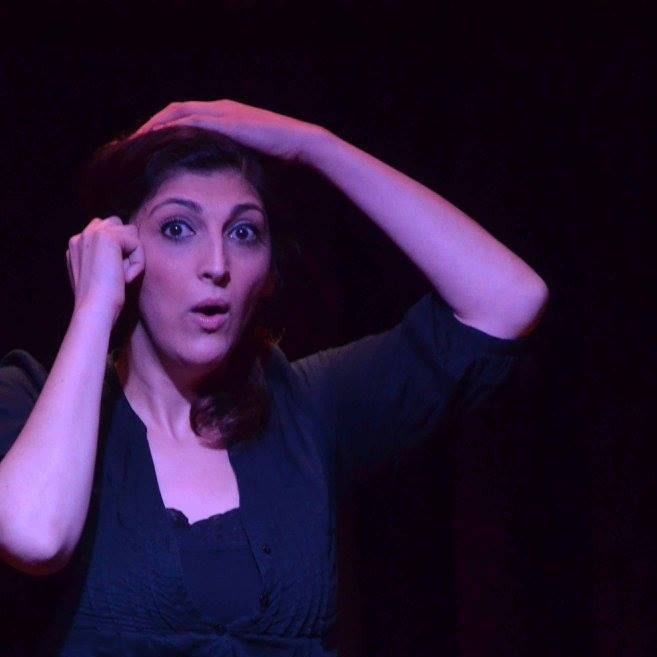
- Noorbakhsh at PRI's Global Nation
- Born: June 11, 1980 (age 46); Sacramento County, California, U.S.
- Notable work: All Atheists are Muslim; #GoodMuslimBadMuslim

Comedy career
- Medium: Stand-up
- Subjects: Religion, American politics
- Website: zahranoorbakhsh.com

Zahra Noorbakhsh (born June 11, 1980) is an Iranian-American comedian, writer, actor and co-host of the #GoodMuslimBadMuslim podcast. The New Yorker called her one-woman show All Atheists Are Muslim a highlight of the New York International Fringe Festival. She is a contributor to the New York Times featured anthology Love Inshallah: The Secret Love Lives of American Muslim Women, with a monthly column entitled, "My Infidel Husband". Noorbakhsh was a featured comic at the first-ever Muslim Funny Fest in New York City.

== Career ==
Noorbakhsh graduated from the University of California, Berkeley with a degree in Theatre & Performance Studies in 2006. Though she began as a stand-up comic, her love of impressions, characters and storytelling drew her into the world of theater and ultimately solo performance. Her solo performance career began in 2007 under the direction of W. Kamau Bell at the Solo Performance Workshop, where Noorbakhsh penned several shows, including All Atheists Are Muslim and Hijab and Hammerpants.

She played a half-Persian friend in the web series The Van Life. She has also performed a live recording of the #GoodMuslimBadMuslim podcast with her co-host Tanzila Ahmed on the grounds of the White House.

== Personal life ==
Noorbakhsh grew up in Danville, California with her mother, father, and three siblings. Much of her comedy revolves around growing up as a second generation Iranian-American Shia Muslim. She lives and works in San Francisco, California, with her husband, Duncan. She is also a member of the San Francisco Writers' Grotto.

Her work with the podcast #GoodMuslimBadMuslim stems from a conversation with her co-host Tanzila Ahmed. Zahra has stated that she eats pork and drinks alcohol but still feels strongly about her Muslim identity.
