= Kate Schatz =

American feminist, writer, activist, and educator

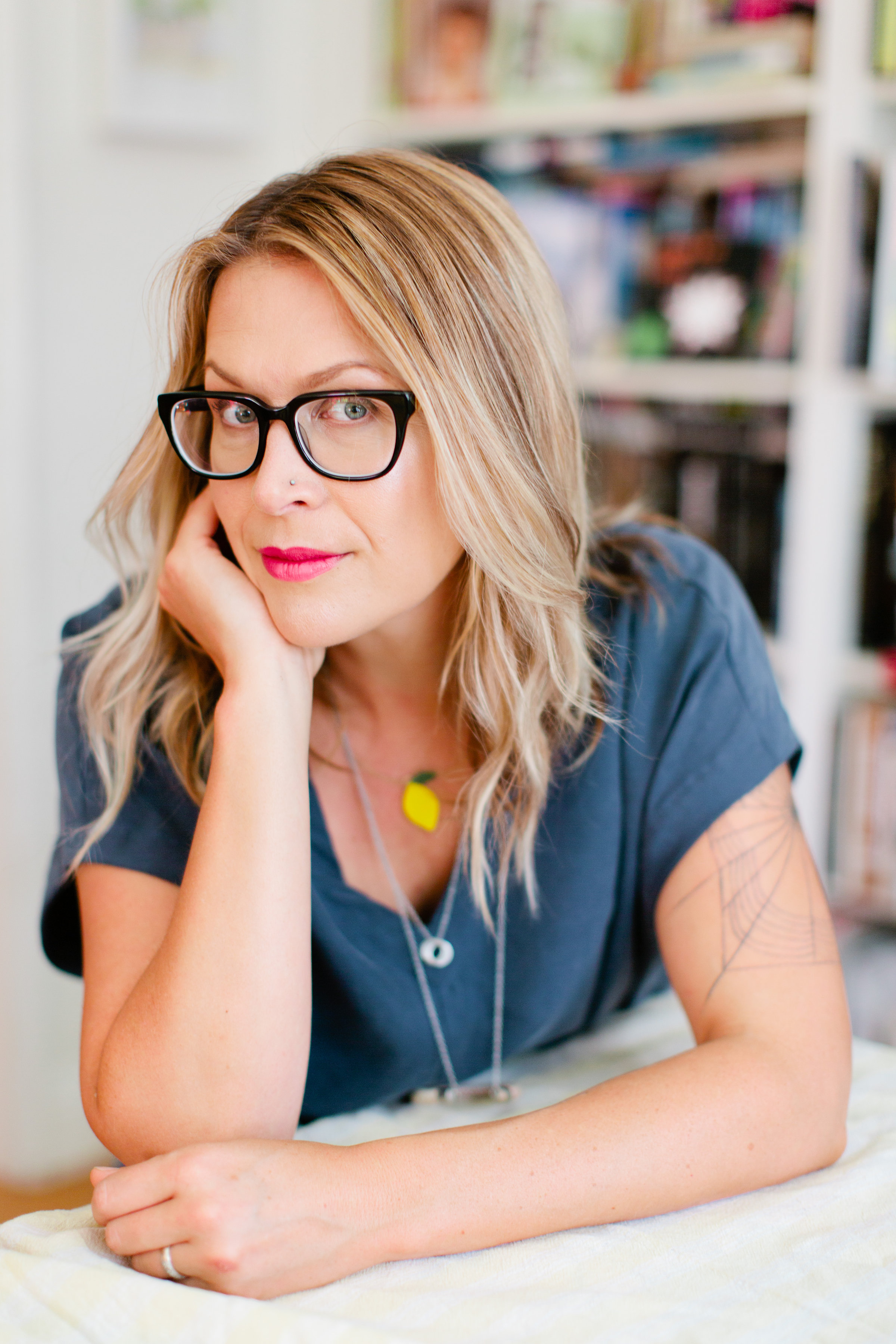
- Schatz in 2016
- Education: University of California, Santa Cruz (BA); Brown University (MFA)
- Occupation(s): writer, editor, educator
- Website: http://www.kateschatz.com/

Kate Schatz is an American writer, activist and public speaker. Along with W. Kamau Bell she co-authored Do the Work: An Antiracist Activity Book that was published in 2022. She is the creator of the Rad Women book series, along with illustrator Miriam Klein Stahl.

Her book of fiction, Rid of Me: A Story, was published in 2006 as part of the 33⅓ series; it is based on the 1993 PJ Harvey album of the same title.

== Selected works ==
- Do the Work: An Antiracist Activity Book (co-authored with W. Kamau Bell) (2022)
- Rad American History A-Z (2020)
- Rad Girls Can (2018)
- My Rad Life: A Journal (2017)
- Rad Women Worldwide (2016)
- Rad American Women A-Z (2015)
- Folsom, Survivor (2010)
- Rid of Me: A Story (2006)
