= Vredenburgh, Alabama =

- Town
- Location of Vredenburgh in Monroe County, Alabama.
- Coordinates: 31°49′25″N 87°19′04″W
- Country: United States
- State: Alabama
- County: Monroe

Area
  - Total: 1.52 sq mi (3.93 km^{2})
  - Land: 1.50 sq mi (3.89 km^{2})
  - Water: 0.015 sq mi (0.04 km^{2})
- Elevation: 141 ft (43 m)

Population (2020)
  - Total: 222
  - Density: 147.7/sq mi (57.02/km^{2})
- Time zone: UTC-6 (Central (CST))
  - Summer (DST): UTC-5 (CDT)
- ZIP code: 36481
- Area code: 334
- FIPS code: 01-79272
- GNIS feature ID: 2406808

Vredenburgh (/ˈvriːdənbɜːrɡ/) is a town in Monroe County, Alabama, United States. It incorporated in 1912. At the 2020 census, the population was 222.

== Geography ==
According to the U.S. Census Bureau, the town has a total area of 1.5 square miles (3.9 km^{2}), of which 1.5 square miles (3.9 km^{2}) is land and 0.015 square miles (0.04 km^{2}), or 0.90%, is water.

== Demographics ==
Historical population
Census	Pop.	Note	%±
1920	874		—
1930	815		−6.8%
1940	666		−18.3%
1950	796		19.5%
1960	632		−20.6%
1970	521		−17.6%
1980	433		−16.9%
1990	313		−27.7%
2000	327		4.5%
2010	312		−4.6%
2020	222		−28.8%
U.S. Decennial Census; 2013 Estimate

=== 2020 census ===
Vredenburgh town, Alabama – Racial and ethnic composition Note: the US Census treats Hispanic/Latino as an ethnic category. This table excludes Latinos from the racial categories and assigns them to a separate category. Hispanics/Latinos may be of any race.
Race / Ethnicity (NH = Non-Hispanic)	Pop 2010	Pop 2020	% 2010	% 2020
White alone (NH)	21	16	6.73%	7.21%
Black or African American alone (NH)	286	206	91.67%	92.79%
Native American or Alaska Native alone (NH)	1	0	0.32%	0.00%
Asian alone (NH)	0	0	0.00%	0.00%
Pacific Islander alone (NH)	0	0	0.00%	0.00%
Some Other Race alone (NH)	0	0	0.00%	0.00%
Mixed Race or Multi-Racial (NH)	0	0	0.00%	0.00%
Hispanic or Latino (any race)	4	0	1.28%	0.00%
Total	312	222	100.00%	100.00%

As of the census of 2000, there were 327 people, 98 households, and 81 families residing in the town. The population density was 217.4 inhabitants per square mile (83.9/km^{2}). There were 120 housing units at an average density of 79.8 per square mile (30.8/km^{2}). The racial makeup of the town was 10.70% White, 88.99% Black or African American, and 0.31% from two or more races.

There were 98 households, out of which 41.8% had children under the age of 18 living with them, 38.8% were married couples living together, 37.8% had a female householder with no husband present, and 17.3% were non-families. 15.3% of all households were made up of individuals, and 5.1% had someone living alone who was 65 years of age or older. The average household size was 3.34 and the average family size was 3.72.

In the town, the population was spread out, with 37.6% under the age of 18, 10.7% from 18 to 24, 26.3% from 25 to 44, 17.1% from 45 to 64, and 8.3% who were 65 years of age or older. The median age was 28 years. For every 100 females, there were 78.7 males. For every 100 females age 18 and over, there were 67.2 males.

The median income for a household in the town was $27,321, and the median income for a family was $27,917. Males had a median income of $26,500 versus $10,833 for females. The per capita income for the town was $5,892. About 27.7% of families and 31.0% of the population were below the poverty line, including 35.3% of those under age 18 and 30.4% of those age 65 or over.

== Notable people ==
- Walter Bell, businessman and Alabama Commissioner of Insurance from 2003 to 2008
- Dorothy Vredenburgh Bush, secretary of the Democratic National Committee, lived in Vredenburgh for several years
- Moses Denson, former professional football player
- John Drew, member of the Atlanta Hawks
- Mike Stewart, author of mystery/suspense novels set primarily in the South
