= Carl Spaatz =

United States Air Force general (1891–1974)

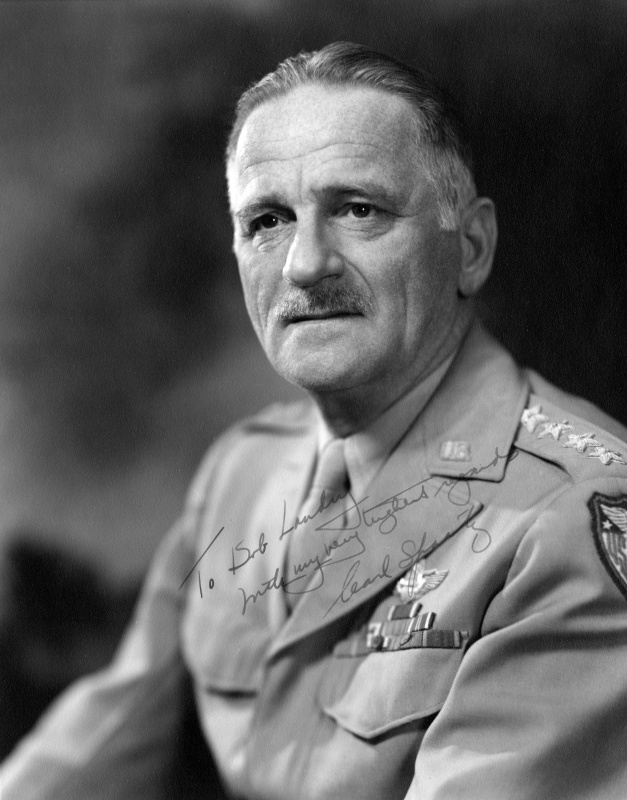
- Born: 28 June 1891; Boyertown, Pennsylvania, US
- Died: 14 July 1974 (aged 83); Washington, D.C., US
- Burial place: United States Air Force Academy Cemetery
- Military career
- Allegiance: United States
- Branch: United States Army; Army Air Service; Army Air Corps; Army Air Forces; United States Air Force; Civil Air Patrol
- Service years: 1914–1947 (Army); 1947–1948 (Air Force); 1948–1959 (Civil Air Patrol)
- Rank: General
- Nickname: "Tooey"
- Service number: 0-3706
- Units: Infantry Branch
- Commands: Chief of Staff of the United States Air Force; U.S. Strategic Air Forces in the Pacific; U.S. Strategic Air Forces in Europe; Fifteenth Air Force; Twelfth Air Force; Eighth Air Force; Air Force Combat Command; 7th Bombardment Group; 1st Pursuit Group; Kelly Field; 31st Aero Squadron
- Conflicts: Mexican Expedition; World War I World War II
- Awards: Distinguished Service Cross; Army Distinguished Service Medal (4); Legion of Merit; Distinguished Flying Cross; Bronze Star Medal

Signature
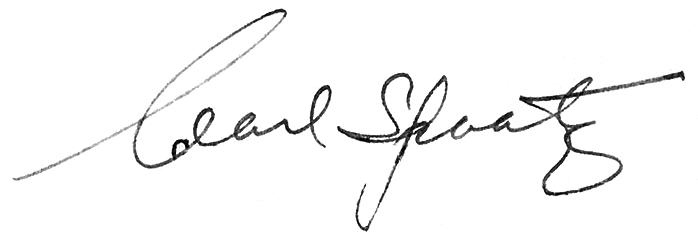

Carl Andrew Spaatz (born Spatz; 28 June 1891 – 14 July 1974), nicknamed "Tooey", was an American World War II general. As commander of Strategic Air Forces in Europe in 1944, he successfully pressed for the bombing of the enemy's oil production facilities as a priority over other targets. After VE Day he was transferred to the Pacific and assumed command of the U.S. Strategic Air Forces in the Pacific. He became Chief of Staff of the newly formed United States Air Force in 1947.

== Early life ==
Carl Andrew Spatz was born on 28 June 1891, in Boyertown, Pennsylvania, to Anna Amelia (née Muntz) and Charles Busch Spatz. Spaatz had an older sister Flora (1889–1971).

Of German ancestry, in 1937 Spaatz legally added the second "a" to his surname at the request of his wife and three daughters to clarify the pronunciation of the name, as many pronounced it "spats". The second "a" was added, as it was in the European branch of his family, to draw out the sound like an "ah", similar to the "a" in "father." The name is thus correctly pronounced in American English identically to "spots". (Note: Spaatz was a neighbor and close associate of Lieutenant Colonel Robert Olds at Langley Field, Virginia in the 1930s. Olds had similarly changed the spelling of his name (from Oldys) in 1931 because of common mispronunciation and recommended Spaatz to the same attorney he used for his own change.)

His father was a state senator who ran a printing shop and a small newspaper, The Berks County Democrat, which he published from 1904 to 1930. While a student his son worked as a linotype operator.

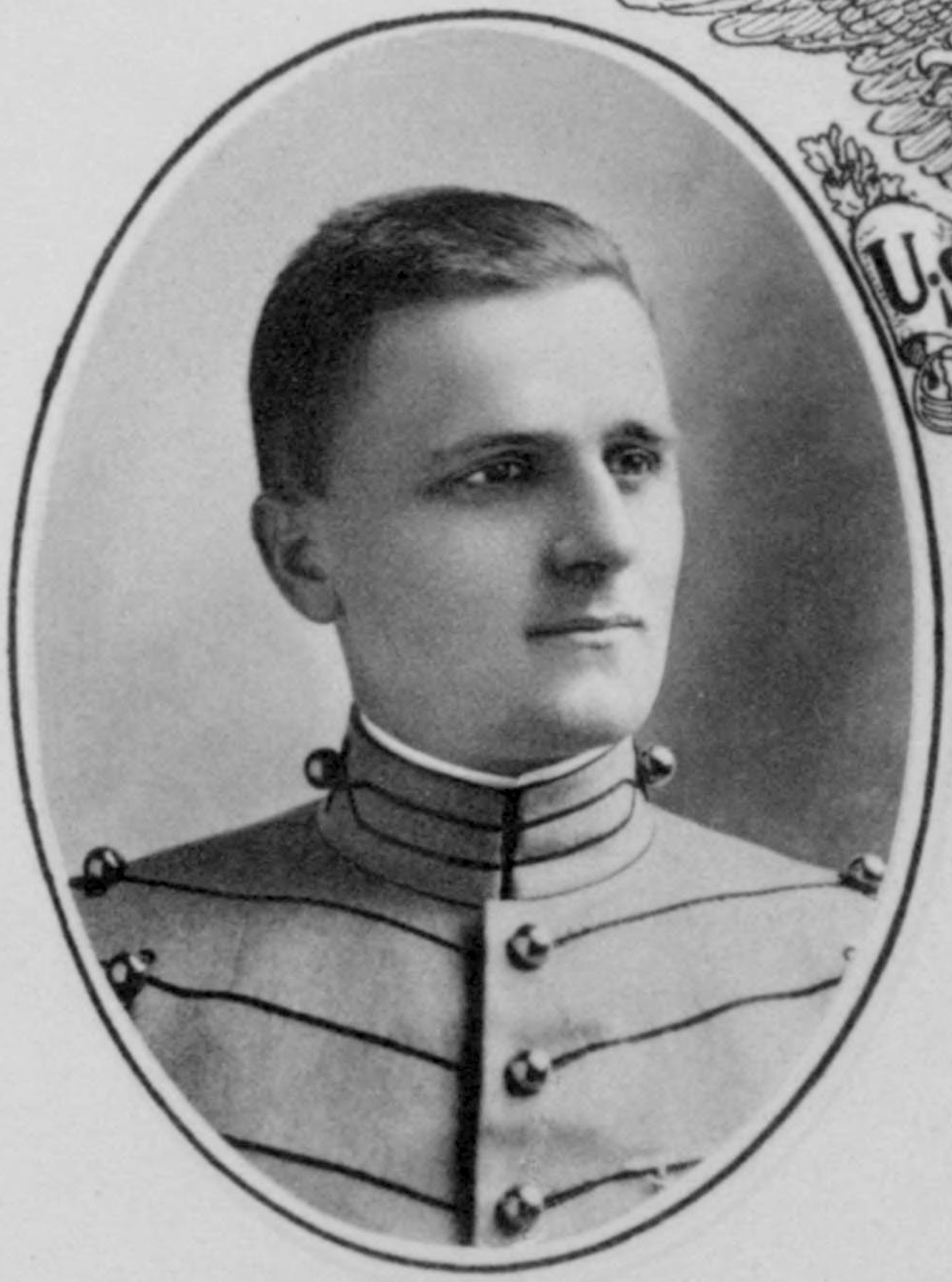
At West Point in 1914

Using his influence his father was able to obtain a West Point appointment for his son. It was while at West Point that Spaatz received his nickname "Tooey" because of his resemblance to another red-headed cadet named F.J. Toohey. He graduated as a second lieutenant of Infantry on 12 June 1914, ranked 57th out of a class of 107. Among his fellow graduates included men such as William H. Holcombe, James B. Cress, Charles P. Gross, Brehon B. Somervell, Robert W. Crawford, Dabney O. Elliott, Arthur R. Harris, LaRhett L. Stuart, John B. Anderson, Harry C. Ingles, James L. Bradley, John H. Woodberry, Harold F. Loomis, Harold R. Bull, Charles M. Milliken, Joseph W. Byron, Paul C. Paschal, Francis R. Kerr, Vicente Lim, Sylvester D. Downs Jr., Orlando Ward, Benjamin G. Weir, Ralph Royce, William O. Ryan, Frank W. Milburn, John B. Thompson and Jens A. Doe. All of them would later rise to the rank of brigadier general or higher in their later military careers.

Following his graduation from West Point as an infantry lieutenant he served with the 25th Infantry at Schofield Barracks, Hawaii, until his assignment to the Signal Corps Aviation School at San Diego, California, between 13 October 1915, and 15 May 1916, for pilot training. He was detailed to the Aviation Section, U.S. Signal Corps in Mexico on 8 June 1916, after earning his Junior Military Aviator rating.

Spaatz served in the First Aero Squadron, which was attached to General John J. Pershing during the Punitive Expedition. Spaatz was promoted to first lieutenant on 1 July 1916, and to captain on 15 May 1917, a few weeks after the American entry into World War I.

== World War I ==
Following America's entry into World War I, Spaatz was sent with the American Expeditionary Forces (AEF) in command of the 31st Aero Squadron. Spaatz was appointed Officer in Charge, American Aviation School at Issoudun Aerodrome, France but after receiving orders to return to the United States, he saw three weeks of action during the final months of the war with the 13th Aero Squadron as a supernumerary pilot. In this brief period, Spaatz shot down three enemy planes and was awarded the Distinguished Service Cross; during the time he was promoted to the temporary rank of major on 17 June 1918.

== Interwar ==
In early 1919, Spaatz was appointed to lead one of the three "troupes" of the U.S. Army Air Service Victory Loan Flying Circus. His group consisted of about twenty-five officers and fifty enlisted men. His airplanes on the tour included five JN6 Jennies, five Fokker D VIIs, four RAE SE-5s and five Spad VIIs. The team gave promotional rides and flew aerial demonstrations across the Western and Southwestern United States from early April through mid-May 1919 to raise money to retire the World War I debt.

Spaatz served in California and Texas and became assistant department air service officer for the Western Department in July 1919. Spaatz experienced the chaotic ups and downs in rank common to Regular officers in 1920, when the National Defense Act of 1920 reorganized the military. He first reverted to his permanent rank of captain of Infantry on 27 February 1920. On 1 July, when the Air Service became a combatant arm of the line, he transferred to the Air Service as a captain, then was promoted to major on the same date by virtue of a provision in the National Defense Act that allowed officers who earned their rank in service with the AEF to retain it. This made him senior to a number of officers, including Henry H. Arnold (his superior at the time), with greater longevity of service. On 18 December 1922, Spaatz was discharged when Congress set a new ceiling on the number of majors authorized for the Air Service, and reappointed as a captain, then promoted again to major on 1 February 1923.

As a major, Spaatz commanded Kelly Field, Texas, from 5 October 1920, to February 1921, served at Fort Sam Houston as air officer of the Eighth Corps Area until November 1921, and was commanding officer of the 1st Pursuit Group, first at Ellington Field, Texas, and later at Selfridge Field, Michigan, until 24 September 1924. He graduated from the Air Corps Tactical School, Langley Field, Virginia, in June 1925, and then served in the Office of the Chief of Air Corps at Washington, D.C. Later that year he testified for the defence at the court-martial of Colonel Billy Mitchell.

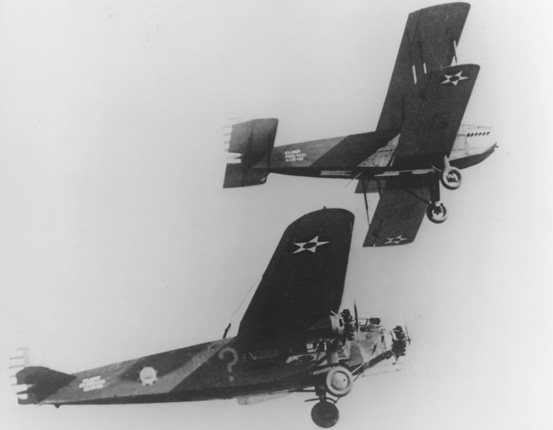
The Question Mark being refueled by a Douglas C-1

From 1 to 7 January 1929, Spaatz along with fellow Air Corps officers, Captain Ira Eaker and Lieutenant Elwood Quesada, both of whom would later become senior United States Army Air Forces (USAAF) generals, established an aviation record by keeping the airplane Question Mark in the air over the Los Angeles vicinity for over 150 hours. For his efforts he was awarded the Distinguished Flying Cross.

From 8 May 1929, to 29 October 1931, Spaatz commanded the 7th Bombardment Group at Rockwell Field, California, and the 1st Bombardment Wing at March Field, California, until 10 June 1933. He then served in the Office of the Chief of Air Corps and became chief of the Training and Operations Division. In August 1935, he enrolled in the Command and General Staff School at Fort Leavenworth, Kansas, and while there was promoted to lieutenant colonel on 16 September. He graduated in June 1936, and then served at Langley Field on the staff of Major General Frank M. Andrews, commander of General Headquarters Air Force, until January 1939, when he returned to the Office of the Chief of Air Corps at Washington as assistant executive officer.

On 7 November 1939, Spaatz received a temporary promotion to colonel, and during the Battle of Britain in 1940, spent several weeks in England as a special military observer. This roving assignment when combined with his Teutonic name gave rise to rumors to which he once responded by signing in at a British airbase as "Col. Carl A. Spaatz, German spy."

In August, he was assigned in the Office of the Chief of Air Corps, and two months later was appointed assistant to the chief of Air Corps, General Arnold, with the temporary rank of brigadier general. He became chief of the Plans Division of the Air Corps in November 1940, and the following July was named chief of the air staff at Army Air Forces Headquarters.

== World War II ==
Army Chief of Staff George Marshall named Spaatz commander of Air Force Combat Command in January 1942 and promoted him to the temporary rank of major general. In May 1942 Spaatz became commander of the Eighth Air Force and transferred its headquarters to England in July. Spaatz was placed in overall command of the USAAF in the European Theater of Operations, while retaining his Eighth Air Force command. He was promoted to the permanent rank of Major General in September 1942.

He was named commander of the Allied Northwest African Air Forces in February 1943 which comprised the Northwest African Strategic Air Force , Northwest African Coastal Air Force and Northwest African Tactical Air Force. Spaatz became commander of the Twelfth Air Force in March 1943, the actual elements of the 12AF being spread across the NAAF.

Spaatz was named commander of the Fifteenth Air Force, and Royal Air Forces in Italy in November 1943, and the U.S. Strategic Air Forces in Europe in January 1944. Spaatz received a temporary promotion to lieutenant general in March 1943.

"It is hard to think of another commander in the USAAF who had enough influence with General Eisenhower to hold off, as well as Spaatz did, the diversions proposed by Leigh-Mallory. Neither is it easy to think of any other who had both the perception to identify oil targets as decisive and the strength to conserve a part of the U.S. strategic air striking power for them.

— biographer David R. Mets

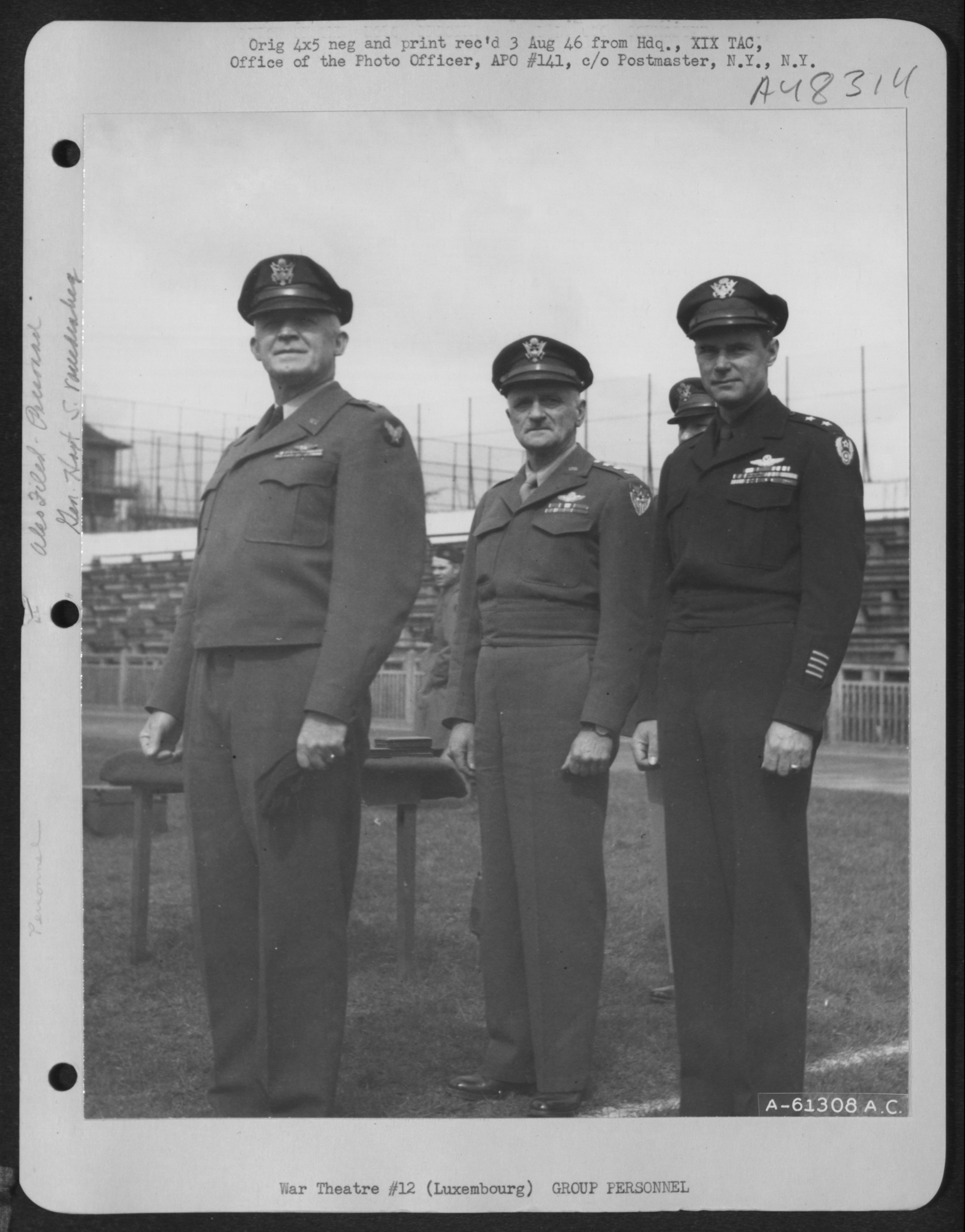
Generals Arnold, Spaatz, and Vandenberg at decoration ceremonies held in Luxembourg City on 7 April 1945

As commander of Strategic Air Forces, Spaatz directed the United States portion of the strategic bombing campaign against Germany, directing the Eighth Air Force, which was then commanded by Lieutenant General Jimmy Doolittle (who had commanded the Northwest African Strategic Air Force under Spaatz) based in England, and the Fifteenth Air Force, which was now commanded by Lieutenant General Nathan Twining, based in Italy.

As the commander of Strategic Air Forces in Europe, Spaatz was under the direct command of General Dwight Eisenhower. In March 1944, Spaatz proposed the Oil Plan for bombing, and in June 1944 during the Operation Crossbow priority bombing of V-1 sites aimed at the UK, Spaatz advocated, and received authorization from Eisenhower for, bombing of those targets at a lower priority. Spaatz also identified that "...the chimera of one air operation that will end the war...does not exist", and advocated Air Chief Marshal Sir Arthur Tedder's plan "which retained the oil system in first position, but more clearly placed Germany's rail system in second priority", which encouraged Eisenhower to overrule the British Air Ministry fears that the "thrust against the oil industry" might be weakened. Spaatz's "Oil Plan" became the highest bombing priority in September 1944. After the war, Eisenhower said that Spaatz, along with General Omar Bradley, was one of the two American general officers who had contributed the most to the victory in Europe.

Spaatz received a temporary promotion to the rank of general on 11 March 1945. After VE Day he was transferred to the Pacific and assumed command of the U.S. Strategic Air Forces in the Pacific as part of the Pacific Theatre of Operations, with headquarters on Guam, in July 1945. From this command, Spaatz directed the strategic bombing of Japan, including the atomic bombings of Hiroshima and Nagasaki. Spaatz was present at Reims when the Germans surrendered to the Americans on 7 May 1945; at Berlin when they surrendered to the Soviets on 8 May; and aboard the battleship Missouri in Tokyo Bay when the Japanese surrendered on 2 September. He was the only man of general rank or equivalent present at all three of these acts of surrender. On 10 May, Spaatz conducted an interrogation of Hermann Göring, along with an American historian Bruce Campbell Hopper at the Ritter School in Augsburg, Germany.

== Civil Air Patrol ==
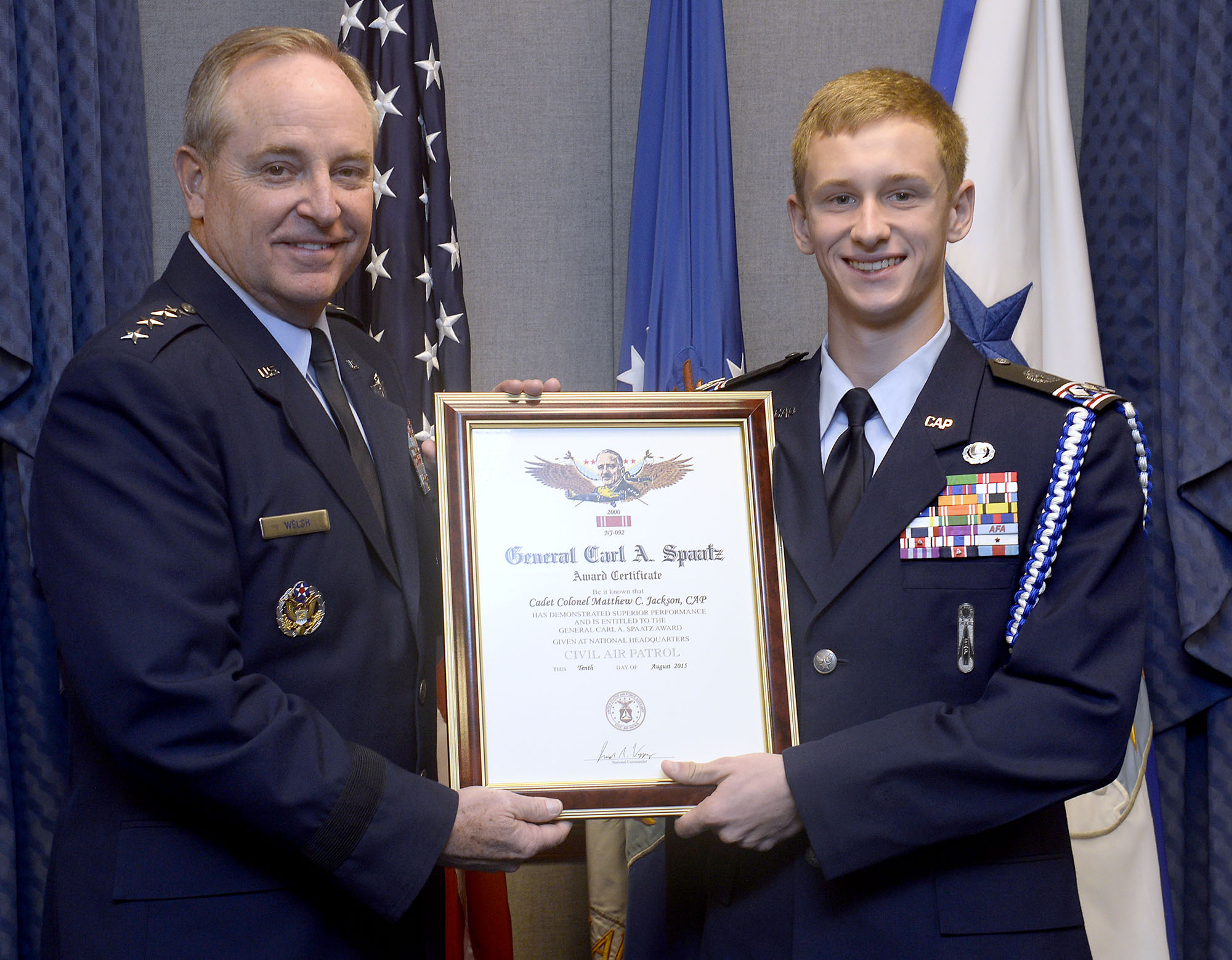
Air Force Chief of Staff Gen. Mark A. Welsh III presents Civil Air Patrol Cadet Matthew C. Jackson (NJ) the Gen. Spaatz Award, 2015

From 1948 until 1959, he served as the second Chairman of Civil Air Patrol's National Board. In 1964, CAP honored him by making his name synonymous with the highest cadet achievement, C/Colonel. The award's first recipient being C/Col Douglas C. Roach from Michigan Wing in November of the same year. Since then, only 2,280 cadets have received this honor nationwide (as of February 2022).

== Later life ==
In July 1945, President Harry S. Truman nominated Spaatz for promotion to the permanent rank of general. Spaatz succeeded Arnold as Commanding General of the Army Air Forces on 11 February 1946. After the creation of the independent Air Force by the National Security Act of 1947 and Truman's Executive Order No. 9877, Spaatz was appointed as the first Chief of Staff of the new United States Air Force in September 1947.

Spaatz retired from the military at the rank of general on 30 June 1948, and worked for Newsweek magazine as military affairs editor until 1961. He also served on the Committee of Senior Advisors to the Air Force Chief of Staff from 1952 until his death; and was the first President of the Air Force Historical Foundation during 1953. In 1954, Spaatz was appointed to the congressional advisory board set up to determine the site for the new United States Air Force Academy.

Spaatz died at the Walter Reed Medical Center in Washington, D.C., on 14 July 1974, from congestive heart failure.

He was buried at the Academy's cemetery in Colorado Springs, Colorado.

== Personal life ==
Spaatz married Ruth Harrison in 1917. Ruth was born on 28 April 1896, in Fort Riley, Kansas. She died on 19 November 1989, in Maryland. The couple had three children.

Katherine ("Tattie") served in the American Red Cross mobile unit in England during World War II and later married British intelligence officer Walter Bell (diplomat) in 1948. She died in 2005. Rebecca married Emmet B. Gresham, Jr. (25 March 1923 – 25 February 1954) on 13 February 1943. Following his death Rebecca married Steven P. Nagel.

Carla married Francis D. Thomas Jr. at Fort Myer on 4 April 1951.

== Legacy ==
- Spaatz Island in Antarctica is named for Spaatz, who provided an airplane used in its discovery.
- The Civil Air Patrol's highest cadet award is the General Carl A. Spaatz Award.
- In 1977, Spaatz was inducted into the International Air & Space Hall of Fame.
- Since 1984 Carl Andrew Spaatz Field has been the name for Reading Regional Airport in Pennsylvania which serves Reading, Pennsylvania. It is also home to the Mid-Atlantic Air Museum.
- Carl A. Spaatz Center for Officer Education, Air University (AU) at Maxwell Air Force Base, Alabama.
- Spaatz was chosen as the United States Air Force Academy class exemplar for the Class of 2006.
- National Museum of the United States Air Force is located at 1100 Spaatz Street on Wright-Patterson Air Force Base, Ohio.
- General Spaatz Boulevard is located adjacent to Sarasota-Bradenton International Airport (SRQ) in Sarasota, Florida, intersecting Tamiami Trail / US 41.
- The Outstanding Air Refueling Squadron in the USAF is annually awarded the Gen Carl A. Spaatz Trophy.
- The Air Force Historical Foundation's highest recognition for individual contribution to the making of Air Force history is the General Carl "Tooey" Spaatz Award
- In 2002 he was inducted into the Airlift/Tanker Association Hall of Fame.
- A section of Pennsylvania Route 562 in Berks County from the intersection with State Route 73 in the borough of Boyertown to the intersection with State Route 662 at the township line between Amity Township and Oley Township was on 28 June 2018, named the General Carl A. Spaatz Memorial Highway in his honor.
- The General Carl Spaatz National USAAF Museum on General Spaatz Avenue in Boyertown, Pennsylvania is named after him. The museum opened on 2 October 2021.
- Spaatz was portrayed by Stephen Roberts in the 1955 film The Court Martial of Billy Mitchell and by Don Fellows in the 1979 television miniseries Ike: The War Years.

== Awards and decorations ==
Source: USAF Historical Study 91: Biographical Data on Air Force General Officers, 1917–1952, Vol. II, "L-Z"

Command pilot
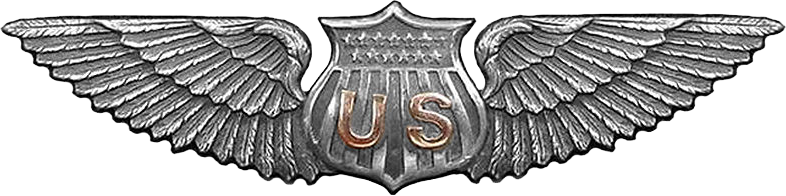
Junior Military Aviator
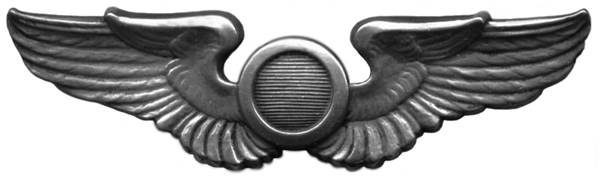
Combat Observer

Distinguished Service Cross
Distinguished Service Medal (with three oak leaf clusters)
Legion of Merit
Distinguished Flying Cross
Bronze Star Medal
Air Medal
Mexican Service Medal
World War I Victory Medal with three battle stars
American Defense Service Medal
American Campaign Medal
Asiatic-Pacific Campaign Medal
European-African-Middle Eastern Campaign Medal with six battle stars
World War II Victory Medal
Knight Grand Cross of the Order of the British Empire (United Kingdom)
Knight of the Order of the Crown with bronze palm (Belgium)
Croix de Guerre with palm (Belgium)
Grand Officer of the Legion of Honor (France)
Croix de Guerre with bronze palm (France)
Commander's Cross with Star (Krzyż Komandorski z Gwiazdą) of the Order of Polonia Restituta (Poland)
Grand Officer of the Order of Orange-Nassau (Netherlands)
Grand Cross of the Order of St. Olav (Norway)
Order of Suvorov Second Class (Union of Soviet Socialist Republics)

Spaatz also received the Collier Trophy for 1944 for "demonstrating the air power concept through employment of American aviation in the war against Germany."

=== Distinguished Service Cross citation ===
Citation

"The President of the United States of America, authorized by Act of Congress, 9 July 1918, takes pleasure in presenting the Distinguished Service Cross to Major (Air Service) Carl Andrew Spatz (ASN: 0–3706), United States Army Air Service, for extraordinary heroism in action while serving with 13th Aero Squadron, U.S. Army Air Service, A.E.F., during the St. Mihiel offensive, 26 September 1918. Although he had received orders to go to the United States, Major Spatz begged for and received permission to serve with a pursuit squadron at the front. Subordinating himself to men of lower rank, he was attached to a squadron as a pilot and saw continuous and arduous service through the offensive. As a result of his efficient work he was promoted to the position of night commander. Knowing that another attack was to take place in the vicinity of Verdun, he remained on duty in order to take part. On the day of the attack west of the Meuse, while with his patrol over enemy lines, a number of enemy aircraft were encountered. In the combat that followed he succeeded in bringing down three enemy planes. In his ardor and enthusiasm he became separated from his patrol while following another enemy far beyond the lines. His gasoline giving out, he was forced to land and managed to land within friendly territory. Through these acts he became an inspiration and example to all men with whom he was associated."

- General Orders: War Department, General Orders No. 123 (1918)
- Action Date: 26 September 1918
- Service: Air Service
- Rank: Major
- Company: 13th Aero Squadron
- Division: American Expeditionary Forces

== Dates of rank ==
Dates of rank
Rank	Component	Date
Cadet	United States Military Academy	1 March 1910
Second Lieutenant	Regular Army	12 June 1914
First Lieutenant	Regular Army	1 July 1916
Captain	Regular Army	15 May 1917
Major	National Army	17 June 1918
Captain	Regular Army	27 February 1920
Major	Regular Army	1 July 1920
Captain	Regular Army	18 December 1922
Major	Regular Army	1 February 1923
Lieutenant colonel	Regular Army	16 September 1935
Colonel	Temporary	7 November 1939
Brigadier general	Temporary	2 October 1940
Major general	Army of the United States	28 January 1942
Colonel	Regular Army	17 September 1942
Lieutenant general	Army of the United States	12 March 1943
Brigadier general	Regular Army	1 September 1943
Major General	Regular Army	5 October 1944
General	Army of the United States	11 March 1945
General	United States Air Force	18 September 1947
General	U.S. Air Force, Retired	30 June 1948

== Notes ==
Military offices
Preceded by Gen. of the Army; Henry H. Arnold	Commanding General, United States Army Air Forces; 1946–1947	Office abolished Army Air Forces replaced by United States Air Force
New office	Chief of Staff of the United States Air Force; 1947–1948	Succeeded by Gen. Hoyt Vandenberg
