= Hari Kondabolu =

American comedian (born 1982)

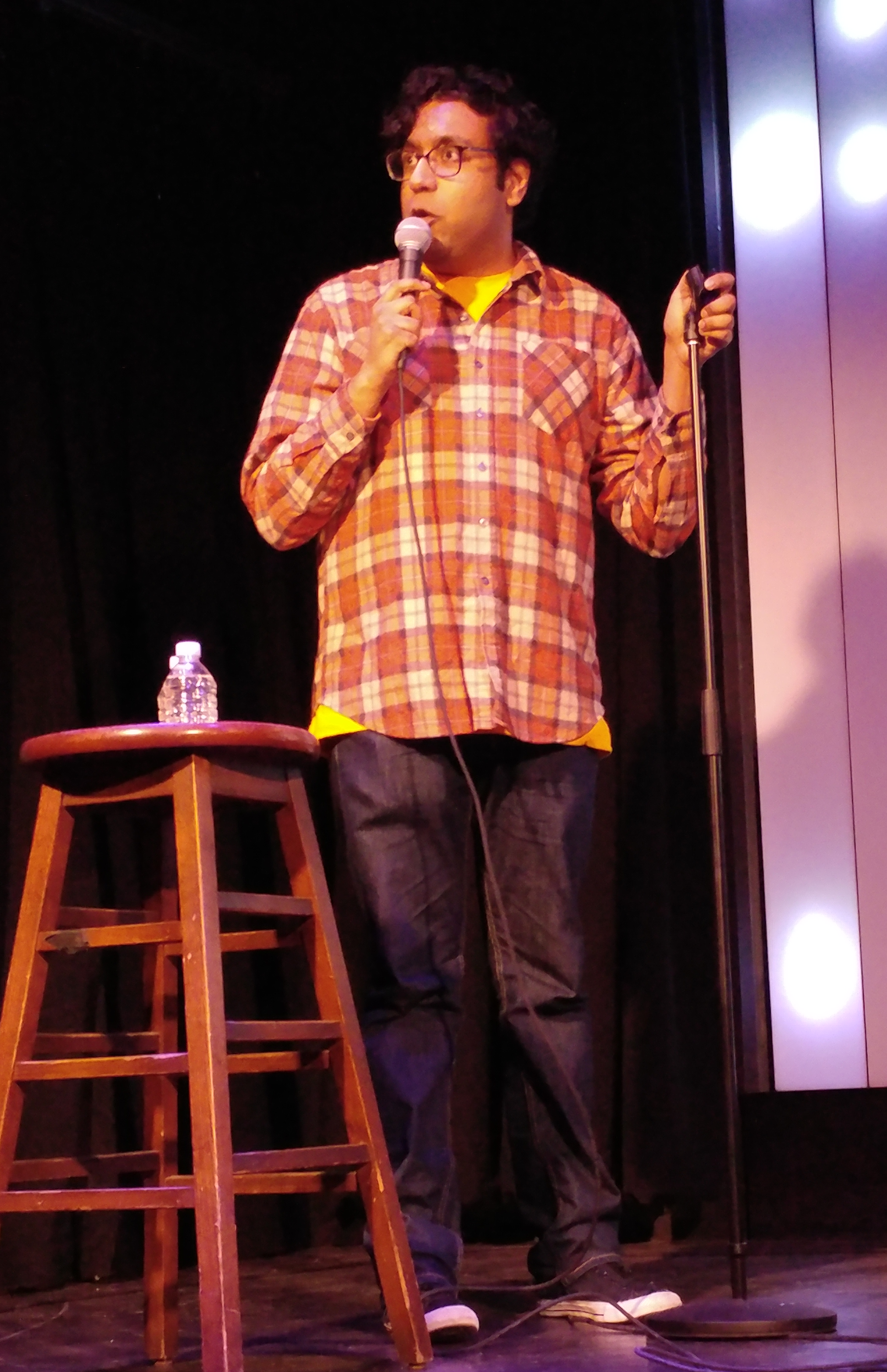
- Kondabolu in 2016
- Born: Hari Karthikeya Kondabolu; October 21, 1982 (age 44); New York City, New York, U.S.
- Education: Bowdoin College (BA); London School of Economics (MS)
- Children: 1
- Relatives: Ashok Kondabolu (brother)

Comedy career
- Years active: 2006–present
- Medium: Stand-up, film, podcasts
- Genres: Observational comedy; political satire
- Subjects: American politics; American culture; Indian culture; pop culture; civil rights; racism
- Website: harikondabolu.com

Hari Karthikeya Kondabolu (born October 21, 1982) is an American stand-up comedian and writer. His comedy covers subjects such as race, inequity, and Indian stereotypes. He was a writer for Totally Biased with W. Kamau Bell and the creator of the 2017 documentary film The Problem with Apu.

== Early life and family ==
Kondabolu was born on October 21, 1982, in the Flushing neighborhood of the New York City borough of Queens, to Uma and Ravi Kondabolu, who had immigrated from the city of Tenali in the Coastal Andhra region of South India. His mother was previously a physician in India, and both parents became the heads of New York area medical labs. Ravi Kondabolu had immigrated to the United States in 1978.

Kondabolu attended public schools in Queens: PS 69 in Jackson Heights, PS 115 in Floral Park, MS 172 in Floral Park, and Townsend Harris High School in Flushing, where he graduated in 2000.

Kondabolu is the older brother of Ashok Kondabolu, who is a former member of the group Das Racist.

=== Education ===
Kondabolu continued performing standup when he attended Bowdoin College; he called his years at Bowdoin "incredibly formative" and continues to spend part of every year in Maine. He studied at Wesleyan University during his third year, focusing on identity and race, globalization, and "the impact of popular culture on society."

Although his stand-up comedy career was gaining traction in 2007, he was accepted to the Masters in Human Rights program at the London School of Economics in 2007, and thus took a hiatus year from stand-up to earn his MSc.

== Stand-up comedy ==
While in Seattle, Kondabolu began participating in its alternative comedy scene. His act included "a bit where I used to read the U.S. citizenship application onstage." In 2006, Kondabolu performed at the Bumbershoot Music and Arts Festival in Seattle, which he credits as his "big break," as a booker for HBO's Comedy Festival saw his name on the Bumbershoot website. Later, Kondabolu also filmed "Hari Kondabolu: Warn Your Relatives" in Seattle.

Kondabolu has since made numerous television appearances as a stand-up comic. His first notable television appearance was on Jimmy Kimmel Live! in 2007, when he also began to appear in a variety of national comedy festivals, including the 2007 HBO US Comedy Arts Festival. In October 2012, he performed stand-up on an episode of Conan and, in March 2014, he performed stand-up on The Late Show with David Letterman. He has made several appearances on Comedy Central, including a 2008 episode of Live at Gotham, three episodes of John Oliver's New York Stand-Up Show in 2010 and 2012, and most prominently, his own episode of Comedy Central Presents which aired on February 11, 2011. He has also appeared a number of times on British television, including on Russell Howard's Good News in 2011 and 8 out of 10 Cats in 2012. In 2012, he had a recurring sketch as part of BBC Three's Live at the Electric hosted by Russell Kane. He has also performed at the Edinburgh Fringe Festival and was a featured comedian for the US State Department-sponsored "Make Chai Not War" comedy showcase in India in 2012.

From 2012 to 2013, he was on the writing staff for the FX comedy series Totally Biased with W. Kamau Bell, produced by Chris Rock and hosted by W. Kamau Bell, on which he often appeared as a correspondent.

His first stand-up comedy album, Waiting for 2042, was released in March 2014 on Kill Rock Stars.

His second comedy album, Mainstream American Comic, was released on July 22, 2016, on Kill Rock Stars. It debuted at #1 on the iTunes US comedy charts and at #2 on the Billboard comedy charts.

Since 2017, Kondabolu has served as a panelist on the NPR comedy news quiz Wait Wait Don't Tell Me.

In 2018, he spoke about his experience of teaching a workshop at the Columbia River Correctional Institute Comedy School in North Portland as a guest on Live Wire! Radio.

=== Themes ===
Kondabolu's humor often centers on social issues such as poverty, racism, and a rejection of Indian stereotypes seen in media. He has spoken about the challenges of dealing with white fragility when addressing race in his comedy. He has also addressed a variety of other social subjects, such as the LGBT community.

=== Podcast host ===
Kondabolu and his younger brother Ashok performed in a monthly, mostly improvised talk show together in New York City called Untitled Kondabolu Brothers Project. Past guests have included Ajay Naidu, Aasif Mandvi, Bell, Leo Allen, Victor Vazquez (Kool AD of Das Racist), Charles Mudede and Blue Scholars. In January 2013, they started Untitled Kondabolu Brothers Podcast. After a hiatus from 2015 onwards, the podcast debuted again as the Kondabolu Brothers Podcast in 2018 on the Earwolf label.

He is a co-host of the podcast Politically Re-Active with Bell, which debuted in June 2016. He also debuted as a rotating host on The Bugle alongside Andy Zaltzman in the fall of 2016 after the departure of John Oliver.

== Acting and film ==
Kondabolu wrote and starred in Zia Mohajerjasbi's 2007 short film Manoj, which has played in comedy and film festivals around the world, including the Just for Laughs Festivals in Montreal and Chicago, and which mocks comedians who broadly exploit their ethnic backgrounds for their material. In Manoj, Kondabolu portrays both Manoj, a fictional Indian immigrant comic who plays to white audiences by repeating their stereotypes of South Asians, and an Indian-American who is critical of Manoj's approach.

Kondabolu portrayed "Crossword Businessman" in the 2009 film All About Steve, a movie he mocks in Mainstream American Comic. He also played a supporting role in the 2016 film Five Nights in Maine, although none of his scenes were included in the final 75-minute cut of the film. Also in 2016, he appeared as a fictionalized version of himself in the Comedy Central web series White Flight.

Kondabolu is the lead, creator, and executive director of The Problem with Apu, a documentary about the character Apu from The Simpsons that premiered in November 2017 on TruTV. The film contextualizes Apu within minstrelsy and other tropes in American pop culture history that have historically stereotyped minorities. He portrayed himself in the Netflix documentary Spelling the Dream. Along with Megan Stalter, Kondabolu is a co-host of Season 1 of Netflix's Snack vs. Chef, a reality cooking competition series.

== Discography ==
- Waiting for 2042 (2014)
- Mainstream American Comic (2016)
- Hari Kondabolu's New Material Night: Volume 1 (recorded 2012, released 2017)
- Hari Kondabolu's New Material Night: Volume 2 (recorded 2012–2018, released 2020)
