= Walter Bell (diplomat) =

British diplomat and intelligence officer

- Born: Walter Fancourt Bell; 7 November 1909; Riverhead, Kent, England
- Died: 23 January 2004 (aged 94)
- Occupation: Intelligence officer
- Awards: CMG, US Medal of Freedom
- Espionage activity
- Allegiance: United Kingdom
- Service branch: Secret Intelligence Service (SIS/MI6) and Security Service (MI5)
- Service years: 1935-1970

Walter Bell CMG (7 November 1909 – 23 January 2004) was a diplomat, an officer of the British Secret Intelligence Service (MI6) and also served in the security service (MI5). He provided a diplomatic link between Britain and America and later worked in security in various post-colonial nations. He was decorated with the Order of St Michael and St George and the US Medal of Freedom.

A biography by Jimmy Burns, A Faithful Spy, was published on 1 October 2023 by Chiselbury Publishing. "Drawing on previously undisclosed personal papers, this biography of Walter Bell gives a remarkable insight into the working of British Intelligence".

== Early life ==
Walter Fancourt Bell was the third and youngest child of the Rev George Fancourt Bell, the Anglican vicar of St Mary’s Riverhead, Kent, and Muriel Backhouse, a poet and artist. The Bell family descended from John Bell (1741-1831), bookseller, publisher and printer, and his son John Browne Bell, the founder of the News of the World. His grandfather Adolphus was editor of the newspaper.

Educated at Tonbridge School and the London School of Economics he taught in various private schools while reading for the Bar. In 1935, attended a recruitment interview with MI6 chief Admiral Hugh Sinclair at a secret MI6 HQ at 21 Queen Anne’s Gate and posted to New York as assistant officer in Passport Control, a cover for employment as an MI6 officer.

== MI6 ==
Bell worked until 1945 in New York, Washington and London liaising with US government departments and agencies. In November 1940 he was on assignment in Mexico when the US navy thwarted an attempt by the Germans to run the British blockade.

During the Second World War he served under William Stephenson in British Security Co-ordination, and fostered UK/US cooperation with the FBI and the nascent American intelligence service the Office of Strategic Services (OSS). He was awarded the US Medal of Freedom at the end of WW2.

While in London, in 1943, he was secretly reported to Moscow by the Soviet agent Kim Philby who he met as an MI6 colleague on two occasions but there is no evidence he was ever recruited by the Russians From 1946-1948 he served as private secretary to Lord Inverchapel the British Ambassador in Washington during a testing period in Cold War power play, UK/US relations, and Soviet intelligence penetration. His embassy colleagues included John Balfour and Donald Maclean, who was later exposed as one of the Cambridge Five.

== MI5 ==
Having transferred to MI5, which was responsible for security on British colonies, Bell served in Kenya as a security liaison officer from 1949-1952. He then transferred to India where he served as First Secretary at the British High Commission New Delhi until 1955. His friendships in India included the intelligence chief Bhola Nath Mullik, who developed close links with MI5. From 1957 to 1960 in the West Indies as the federation headed for self-government. From 1961 to 1967 he returned to Kenya for the transition to independence, becoming counsellor in the British High Commission in Nairobi. He was appointed CMG in the 1967 New Year Honours.

== Personal life ==
Bell married Katharine (‘Tattie’) Spaatz in 1948. She was the eldest daughter of American Air Force general Carl Spaatz, WW2 commander of U.S. Strategic Air Forces in Europe and the first Chief of Staff of the newly formed United States Air Force. Tattie had served in England as a volunteer with an American Red Cross mobile unit in WW2. There were no children. He died on 23 January 2004, aged 94.
