= Walter Bell (businessman) =

American businessman and former government official

Alabama Commissioner of Insurance
- In office 2003–2008
- Governor: Bob Riley

Personal details
- Born: Vredenburgh, Alabama, U.S.
- Children: Kamau
- Education: Spring Hill College

Walter Bell is an American businessman and former government official who was Alabama Commissioner of Insurance from 2003 to 2008.

== Early life and education ==
Bell was born in Vredenburgh, Alabama, and moved to Mobile, Alabama as a child. Bell graduated from Spring Hill College in 1983.

== Career ==
From 1979 to 1983, Bell worked as a branch manager at the First National Bank of Mobile. From 1983 to 2003, he was vice president of the Mutual Life Insurance Company of New York.

Bell was nominated as Alabama Commissioner of Insurance by governor Bob Riley in 2003. After resigning as Insurance Commissioner, Bell was Chairman of Swiss Re America Holding Corporation from 2008 to 2012. Bell is on the board of directors of the Bermuda Monetary Authority, and a commissioner of the Mobile Area Water and Sewer System. Bell is the first international board member of the Bermuda Monetary Authority. He is also a board member of the Mobile Regional Airport.

== Personal life ==
Bell was married to Loresa C. Bell until her death on August 18, 2018. Bell has two children, including comedian and television host W. Kamau Bell.
