= Bruce Campbell Hopper =

American WWI pilot and political scientist (1892–1973)

- Born: August 24, 1892; Litchfield, Illinois, U.S.
- Died: July 6, 1973 (aged 80); Cambridge, Massachusetts, U.S.
- Spouse: Effie Toye

Academic background
- Education: Harvard University
- Influences: Archibald Cary Coolidge

Academic work
- Discipline: Political Science, Sovietologist
- Institutions: Harvard University
- Notable students: Joseph P. Kennedy Jr.; John F. Kennedy; Ted Kennedy
- Influenced: John F. Kennedy; George F. Kennan

96th Aero Squadron
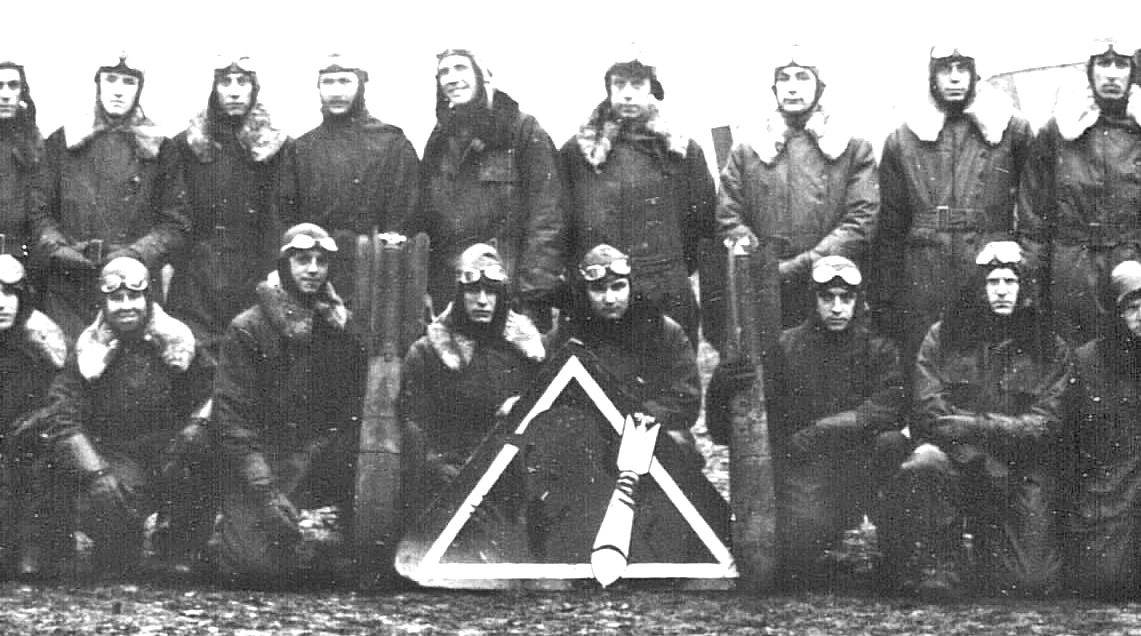
- Aviators of the 96th Aero Squadron, November 1918
- Active: 1917–1919
- Country: United States
- Branch: Air Service, United States Army
- Type: Squadron
- Role: Day Bombardment
- Part of: American Expeditionary Forces (AEF)
- Aircraft type: Breguet 14 B.2 bomber
- Engagements: Battle of Saint-Mihiel; Meuse-Argonne Offensive
- Decorations: Legion of Honor; Croix de Guerre; Silver Star Citation; Pershing Citation

Bruce Campbell Hopper (August 24, 1892 – July 6, 1973) was a World War I aviator, newspaper reporter, author, historian, and lecturer who served as an associate professor of government at Harvard University from 1930 to 1961. He was an early expert on the Soviet Union, authoring influential articles, informing US State department policy, and lecturing extensively for over thirty years. Among his many students were Joseph P. Kennedy Jr., John F. Kennedy, and Ted Kennedy. Dr. Hopper advised John F. Kennedy on the completion of his thesis at Harvard, eventually published as "Why England Slept".

== Early life ==
Born in Litchfield, Illinois Hopper spent his childhood in Billings, Montana. His father, Joseph Hopper, came to the United States from Balloch, Highland, Scotland in 1882 and was a rancher. His mother was Katherine Turnbull. Hopper began college studies at the University of Montana in 1913. He joined the Sigma Nu fraternity at Montana in 1914. In 1916 the Montana Harvard Club recognized his sharp intelligence and potential by offering him a scholarship. He transferred to Harvard shortly thereafter.

== World War 1 ==
Hopper left Harvard in the spring of 1917 and volunteered for the "American Field Service" (AFS) as a truck driver, carrying supplies for the French Army on the Soissons and Reims fronts. When the United States joined the war he resigned from the AFS and enlisted as a Private, First Class in the United States Army Signal Corps, American Expeditionary Forces (AEF). The Army selected him for flight training, and upon completion of that training, commissioned him as a 1st Lieutenant. He went on to serve as a combat pilot, flying the Breguet 14 B.2 bomber with the 96th Aero Squadron in France. Early in 1918 he was injured in a crash, but quickly recovered and flew extensively until the end of hostilities. He was credited with downing two enemy aircraft and was promoted to Captain in October 1918. Highly decorated for his service, Hopper received the French Legion of Honor, the French Croix de Guerre, a Silver Star Citation, and a Pershing Citation, among other awards. At the time of the Armistice, Hopper was one of two survivors of the original 96th Aero squadron.

In 1919 Hopper received orders to the General Headquarters, AEF, Paris for duty in the Army Historical Section/Sorbonne Detachment. While there he wrote both a unit history of the 96th Aero Squadron and the Army's official military history of the day bombing campaign in France, entitled “When the Air was Young: American Day Bombardment, AEF, 1917–1918”.

== Inter-War years ==
Upon his discharge from the Army in 1919, he studied briefly at both the Sorbonne and Exeter College, Oxford University.

From 1921 to 1923 Hopper and a friend traveled the world. They supported themselves by taking jobs as reporters for various English language newspapers, journeying across Europe, the Middle East, Russia, India, Southeast Asia, and China. He returned to his studies at Harvard in 1923 and finished his B.S. in 1924, followed by an M.A. in 1925. In August 1924 Hopper married 26-year-old Effie Toye, of New York. He listed his occupation as “journalist”. They married in Dublin, New Hampshire.

From 1927 to 1929 he continued his studies in the Soviet Union as a fellow of the Institute of Current World Affairs, sponsored by businessman/philanthropist Charles Richard Crane. Upon his return to the United States, he found himself one of the earliest academic experts on the Soviet Union.

Hopper completed his Ph.D. at Harvard in 1930, joining the faculty as an assistant professor of government. Harvard's president, Abbott Lawrence Lowell, encouraged him to publish articles and perform public speaking on the Soviet Union throughout the 1930s. Both shared an interest in exploring how the Soviet experience might be of benefit to the American economy as it suffered through the Great Depression.

Hopper frequently returned to the Soviet Union during the 1930s, again under the sponsorship of Charles Richard Crane. His trips served both academic interests and those of the US State Department who debriefed him upon his return and promptly classified many of his observations. This had the effect of limiting his publishing opportunities, and his supporters felt that fact held back his academic advancement to full professorship. Others, however, believed the real obstacle to his advancement lay in the lack of documentation in his research and writing. Everyone agreed, however, that he was a gifted orator and students flocked to his lectures. US State Department officials such as George F. Kennan and Loy W. Henderson were in frequent contact with Dr. Hopper regarding policy towards Soviet Russia during the 1930s.

Dr. Hopper was initially sympathetic to Soviet efforts to collectivize industry and agriculture under state control, believing the United States could benefit by emulating their centralized planning models. His writing in the early 1930s reflected his belief that the Bolsheviks were modernizing "backward" portions of Asia by advancing industrialization in the Far East, a positive improvement in his estimation. In the early 1930s he correctly predicted that rising Soviet power and influence in the Far East would lead to conflict there with the United States. In view of the famines and widespread starvation that gripped Soviet Russia in 1930s, Hopper coined the phrase that Russia was ready to "starve itself great".

His Russophile views began to wane by 1938, however, when he wrote the "virtue (had) departed from the leaders in Russia."

== Association with John F. Kennedy ==
Dr. Hopper was made an associate professor of government in 1937, teaching political science and international affairs. Three Kennedy brothers (Joseph, John, and Ted) were among his students at Harvard.

He served as the advisor for John F. Kennedy's thesis, later published as "Why England Slept". Kennedy began his thesis in the winter of 1939/40 and came to Dr. Hopper's study once a week for progress reviews. Dr. Hopper's study featured oak-paneling, leather armchairs, and a large fireplace. One wall had the following inscription in Latin: "It will give you pleasure to look back on this scene of suffering". JFK believed that giving aid to Britain and France was a moral imperative, no matter what risk it presented to dragging the United States into war. The two men discussed JFK's thesis and the prospects for war at length, with Dr. Hopper's combat veteran background adding to his credibility.

== World War 2 ==
Dr. Hopper took a six-year sabbatical from teaching during (and immediately after) World War II to serve with the Office of Strategic Services (OSS, precursor to the Central Intelligence Agency) in Sweden, where he observed and interpreted Soviet activities in the Baltic region. Dr. Hopper also served as Chief Historian for the 8th Air Force and U.S. Strategic Air Forces, during which time he was present at an interrogation of Hermann Göring He subsequently served in the Pentagon as special consultant and speechwriter to General Carl A. Spaatz. Dr. Hopper and Gen. Spaatz had served together in World War I.

== Post war ==
In 1946–47, Dr. Hopper served on the site selection board for the new United States Air Force Academy. Upon his return to academia in 1947, he found himself passed over for promotion above associate professor. The classified nature of most of Hopper's research output did not help his prospects, as well as the extended time he spent away from academia with the military, two years more than most of his colleagues. Post war he shifted his teaching interests more towards air power as a factor in international affairs and did not become significantly involved in the new Russian Research Center, known today as the Davis Center for Russian and Eurasian Studies.

In the 1940s and 1950s, Dr. Hopper was a frequent speaker at the Naval War College and Army War College on Soviet/Russian affairs. He also traveled extensively, performing speaking tours across Europe and Central America. He was a Trustee of the World Peace Foundation and held membership in the Institute of Pacific Relations, the American-Russian Institute, the Council of the Foreign Policy Association, and the Council on Foreign Relations.

After retiring from Harvard in 1961, Dr. Hopper lived in Santa Barbara, California.

Shortly before his death he wrote that he was "grateful to Harvard beyond measurement". He added, "Of all the privileges granted to me, I cared most about teaching, especially on my return from World War II". He concluded, "I miss the classroom where it is always morning, and night can never come".

Hopper died on July 6, 1973. His papers are divided between the Library of Congress, the University of Montana, and the University of California, Santa Barbara.
