= Dave Zirin =

American sports journalist

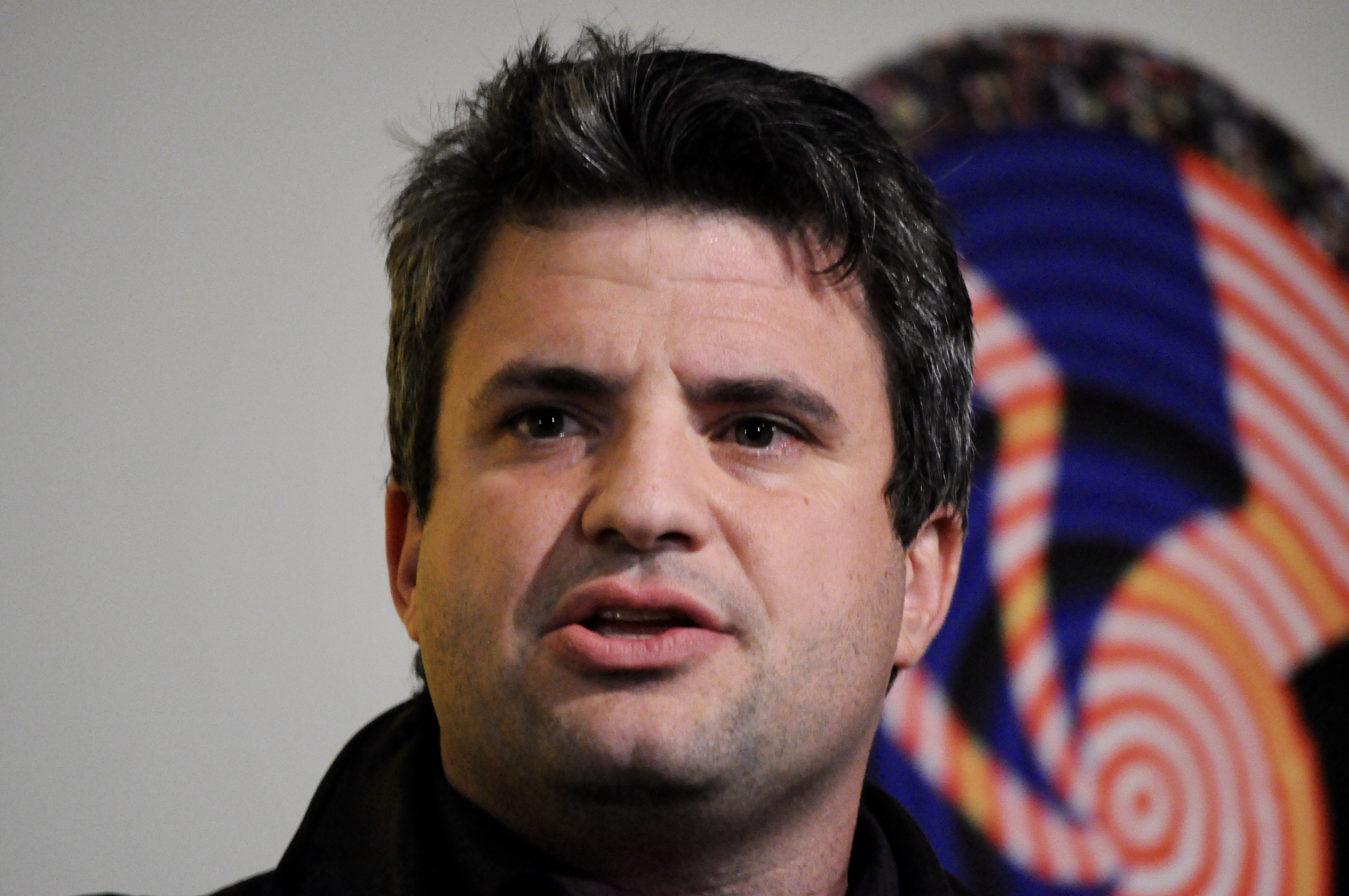
- Born: 1974 (age 51–52)
- Education: Macalester College (BA)
- Occupation: Sports journalism
- Notable credit(s): The John Carlos Story: The Sports Moment That Changed the World; A People's History of Sports in the United States; Welcome to the Terrordome: The Pain, Politics, and Promise of Sports
- Website: edgeofsports.com

Dave Zirin (/ˈzaɪrɪn/ ZY-rin; born 1974) is an American political sportswriter. He is the sports editor for The Nation, a progressive magazine dedicated to politics and culture, and writes a blog named Edge of Sports: the weekly sports column by Dave Zirin. As of January 2026, he has authored twelve books.

== Early life and education ==
Zirin was born in New York City. He is of Jewish descent. He graduated from Macalester College in St. Paul, Minnesota.

== Career ==
Zirin was the host of the Edge of Sports Podcast, hosted by the Slate/Panoply network. He also co-hosted "The Collision: Where Sports and Politics Collide on Pacifica Radio" with former NBA player Etan Thomas. Zirin is a contributor to The Nation, and has been a columnist for SLAM Magazine, and The Progressive. He has been a guest on ESPN's Outside The Lines and Democracy Now!.

His first book, What's My Name, Fool? Sports and Resistance in the United States (Haymarket Books) has entered its third printing.

Zirin has published Welcome to the Terrordome: The Pain, Politics, and Promise of Sports, and A People's History of Sports in the United States, a sports-related volume in the manner of Howard Zinn's A People's History of the United States series for The New Press. In addition to "What's My Name, Fool?", he has also published "The Muhammad Ali Handbook" for MQ Publications. Zirin is also the published children's book author of "My Name is Erica Montoya de la Cruz" (RC Owen). "A People's History of Sports" forms the basis of a documentary co-written and narrated by Zirin called Not Just A Game: Power, Politics and American Sports, produced by the Media Education Foundation. His latest book is The People's Historian: The Outsized Life of Howard Zinn

Zirin is the co-author with John Carlos of The John Carlos Story: The Sports Moment That Changed the World (Haymarket Books, 2011).

He is sports editor at The Nation. He writes a blog named Edge of Sports: the weekly sports column by Dave Zirin.

== Political views ==
Zirin has repeatedly called for boycotts of certain teams, states, or nations for political reasons.

=== Call for boycott of Arizona ===
On April 27, 2010, writing for The Guardian, Zirin called for a boycott against sports teams from Arizona, in particular the Diamondbacks, to protest the Arizona SB 1070, the Support Our Law Enforcement and Safe Neighborhoods Act. He expressed support during the 2010 NBA Playoffs for the Phoenix Suns, who went by "Los Suns" as a statement against the Arizona immigration law.

=== Support of boycotts of Israel ===
On June 2, 2010, writing for The Nation, Zirin justified the decision of the Turkish U-19 soccer team to boycott a match against Israel. He described the Gaza flotilla raid as an act of state terror committed by the Israeli government and proposed a boycott of Israel.

=== Criticism of Hank Williams Jr. ===
On October 6, 2011, during a live interview conducted on the sports cable television network ESPN, Zirin referred to Hank Williams Jr. as racist and proslavery after Williams, the writer and singer of ESPN's then-Monday Night Football theme song, made a political statement comparing multiracial US President Barack Obama to Adolf Hitler.

=== Defense of Barry Bonds ===
In an undated interview, Zirin said, "I never wrote that I believe Bonds has never done steroids." He continued: "unlike oh so many others, the man never actually failed a steroids test. Is there a ton of circumstantial evidence that the man juiced? Absolutely. But he is still the best player I've ever seen. The best player of what will go down as the anabolic era." Zirin said that, rather than steroid use, "much of the reaction to Bonds is simply bad old-fashioned racism".

== Bibliography ==
- What's My Name, Fool? Sports and Resistance in the United States, Chicago: Haymarket Books, 2005. | ISBN 978-1-931859-20-2
- Welcome to the Terrordome: The Pain, Politics, and Promise of Sports, Chicago: Haymarket Books, 2007. | ISBN 978-1-931859-41-7
- Muhammad Ali Handbook, Chicago: MB Press, 2007. | ISBN 978-1-84601-155-9
- A People's History of Sports In The United States, The New Press, 2008. | ISBN 978-1-59558-100-6
- Bad Sports: How Owners Are Ruining the Games We Love, New York: Scribner Books, 2010. | ISBN 978-1-4165-5475-2
- The John Carlos Story: The Sports Moment That Changed the World, Chicago: Haymarket Books, 2011. | ISBN 978-1-60846-127-1
- Game Over: How Politics Has Turned the Sports World Upside Down, The New Press. 2013. | ISBN 978-1-59558-815-9
- Brazil's Dance with the Devil: The World Cup, the Olympics, and the Fight for Democracy, Haymarket Books. 2014. ISBN 9781608463602
- Things That Make White People Uncomfortable Hardcover – Apr 13 2018
- Jim Brown: Last Man Standing Hardcover – May 15, 2018
- The Kaepernick Effect: Taking a Knee, Changing the World—September 14, 2021 - Hardcover
- The People's Historian: The Outsized Life of Howard Zinn. Dutton, 2026. ISBN 978-0-59347-365-8

=== Movies in DVD format ===
- Not Just a Game – Power, Politics & American Sports, Media Education Foundation, 62-minutes, 2011 | ISBN 978-1-932869-50-7
- Race, Power & American Sports, Featuring Dave Zirin, Media Education Foundation, 45-minutes, 2013 | ISBN 978-1-932869-76-7
