= Totally Biased with W. Kamau Bell =

American television series (2012–2013)

- Genre: Comedy; Satire
- Written by: W. Kamau Bell; Ethan T. Berlin; Chuck Sklar; Frank Conniff; Janine Brito; Hari Kondabolu; Danny Vermont; Kevin Avery; Kevin Kataoka; Ned Goldreyer; Louis Katz; Dwayne Kennedy; Aparna Nancherla; Eliza Skinner; Guy Branum; Brian McCann
- Starring: W. Kamau Bell
- Country of origin: United States
- Original language: English
- No. of seasons: 2
- No. of episodes: 64

Production
- Executive producers: Chris Rock; Ethan T. Berlin; Chuck Sklar; Keri Smith Esgula
- Running time: 22 minutes
- Production companies: CR Enterprises; FX Productions

Original release
- Network: FX (2012–13); FXX (2013)
- Release: August 9, 2012 – November 14, 2013

Totally Biased with W. Kamau Bell is an American stand-up comedy television series that premiered on FX on August 9, 2012, starring comedian W. Kamau Bell. On stage, Bell did mostly observational comedy on recent news stories and current events. After an opening PowerPoint monologue, the program usually cut to a segment filmed outside of the studio. Additionally, since all of the show's writers were stand-up comedians, many often appeared as correspondents who performed monologues. As the last segment of the program, Bell interviewed a celebrity guest. In order to ensure the show's topicality, most of the show was taped on the day that it was broadcast. In the first episode, Bell interviewed Chris Rock, who was also an executive producer of the show.

It was announced on November 13, 2013, that Totally Biased with W. Kamau Bell had been canceled, and that the final episode would be broadcast the next day.

== Episodes ==
=== Series overview ===
Season	Episodes	Originally released		
Season	Episodes	First released	Last released	Network
1	26	August 9, 2012	June 20, 2013	FX
2	38	September 4, 2013	November 14, 2013	FXX

=== Season 1 (2012–13) ===
No. overall	No. in season	Guest(s)	Original release date
1	1	Chris Rock	August 9, 2012
2	2	Rachel Maddow	August 16, 2012
3	3	Alex Wagner	August 23, 2012
4	4	Kevin Powell	August 30, 2012
5	5	Issa Rae	September 13, 2012
6	6	Janeane Garofalo	September 20, 2012
7	7	Tom Morello	October 11, 2012
8	8	David Webb	October 18, 2012
9	9	Neil deGrasse Tyson	October 25, 2012
10	10	Chris Hayes & Ted Alexandro	November 1, 2012
11	11	Lewis Black	November 8, 2012
12	12	Wanda Sykes & Hannibal Buress	November 16, 2012
13	13	John Oliver	November 29, 2012
14	14	Matt Taibbi	January 17, 2013
15	15	George Takei	January 24, 2013
16	16	Dave Zirin & Reggie Watts	January 31, 2013
17	17	David Alan Grier & Reggie Watts	February 7, 2013
18	18	Hannibal Buress, Rob Cantrell, Nikki Glaser, and Sara Schaefer	February 14, 2013
19	19	Don Cheadle	February 21, 2013
20	20	Melissa Harris-Perry	May 9, 2013
21	21	Aisha Tyler	May 16, 2013
22	22	Wyatt Cenac & George Takei	May 23, 2013
23	23	Jim Norton, Lindy West, Doug Benson, and Mike Lawrence	May 30, 2013
24	24	Doug Benson, Unlocking the Truth, and Vernon Reid	June 6, 2013
25	25	Trevor Noah and Eddie Pepitone	June 13, 2013
26	26	Billy Porter and Zach "MC Mr. Napkins" Sherwin	June 20, 2013

=== Season 2 (2013) ===
No. overall	No. in season	Guest(s)	Original release date
27	1	Jim Gaffigan	September 4, 2013
28	2	Tracy Morgan	September 5, 2013
29	3	Chris Rock	September 9, 2013
30	4	Jamie Kilstein and John Fugelsang	September 10, 2013
31	5	Laverne Cox	September 11, 2013
32	6	Sarah Silverman	September 12, 2013
33	7	Kristina Wong	September 16, 2013
34	8	Gilbert Gottfried	September 17, 2013
35	9	Michelle Buteau	September 18, 2013
In lieu of an Interview comedian Michelle Buteau performed stand up at the end of the show.
36	10	Dave Zirin	September 19, 2013
37	11	Jeffrey Wright	September 24, 2013
38	12	Tim Wise	September 24, 2013
39	13	Van Jones	September 25, 2013
40	14	Big Freedia	September 26, 2013
41	15	Edward Wyckoff Williams and Aton Edwards	September 30, 2013
42	16	Jesse Ventura	October 1, 2013
43	17	Hannibal Buress	October 2, 2013
44	18	Calise Hawkins	October 3, 2013
45	19	Stephen Rannazzisi	October 14, 2013
46	20	Alison Stewart	October 15, 2013
47	21	Colin Quinn	October 16, 2013
48	22	Death	October 17, 2013
49	23	Jay Smooth	October 21, 2013
50	24	Keith Knight	October 22, 2013
51	25	Henry Louis Gates	October 23, 2013
52	26	Josh Gondleman	October 24, 2013
53	27	Judy Gold	October 28, 2013
54	28	Alex Wagner	October 29, 2013
55	29	Penn Jillette	October 30, 2013
56	30	Touré	October 31, 2013
57	31	Soledad O'Brien	November 4, 2013
58	32	Gregg Deal and Andy Thundercloud	November 5, 2013
59	33	Bill Burr	November 6, 2013
60	34	Maria Bamford	November 7, 2013
61	35	Baratunde Thurston	November 11, 2013
62	36	Kathleen Hanna	November 12, 2013
63	37	Yaba Blay	November 13, 2013
64	38	Jim Norton	November 14, 2013

== Production ==
On September 18, 2012, FX ordered an additional seven episodes of Totally Biased that premiered on October 11, 2012, at 11:30 PM ET. Episode 12 ended up airing at 12:00 AM ET on November 16, 2012, because Brand X with Russell Brand had been extended to an hour. On November 27, FX announced the series would have an additional 13 episodes in the first season beginning on January 17, 2013. After a short break during the 2013 portion of season 1, episodes resumed on May 9, 2013, and continued until the season 1 finale on June 20, 2013. With the launch of FXX, the show would air daily at 11:00 PM ET and began its second season on September 4, 2013.

== Reception ==
The premiere episode received mixed reviews. The A.V. Club gave it a B+ and called it "a much better version of Chocolate News, which drops the sketch comedy bent for more explicit social commentary that blends The Daily Show with what Russell Brand wishes he could get on Brand X". The Los Angeles Times also compared Bell and the show favorably to Brand X, saying that "there is a voluble sweetness to his manner that should prove a tonally better companion" to preceding programs. The San Francisco Chronicle applauded the show's edginess, saying that "it makes The Daily Show look like something your dad watches." Newsday gave the show a B− and was more critical, saying that "Rock may want to light a fire under this act sooner than later." The A.V. Club reviewed the first cycle of season one, giving it a B and stating that it has "positive progress to build on going forward. I's certainly in better shape than Brand X, especially when it just lets Bell do his thing in the opening segment. But the longevity of the show will depend on the star finding a way to shape the out-of-studio segments into something more compelling and growing as an interviewer."

== See also ==
- List of late-night American network TV programs
