= W. Kamau Bell =

American comedian and television host (born 1973)

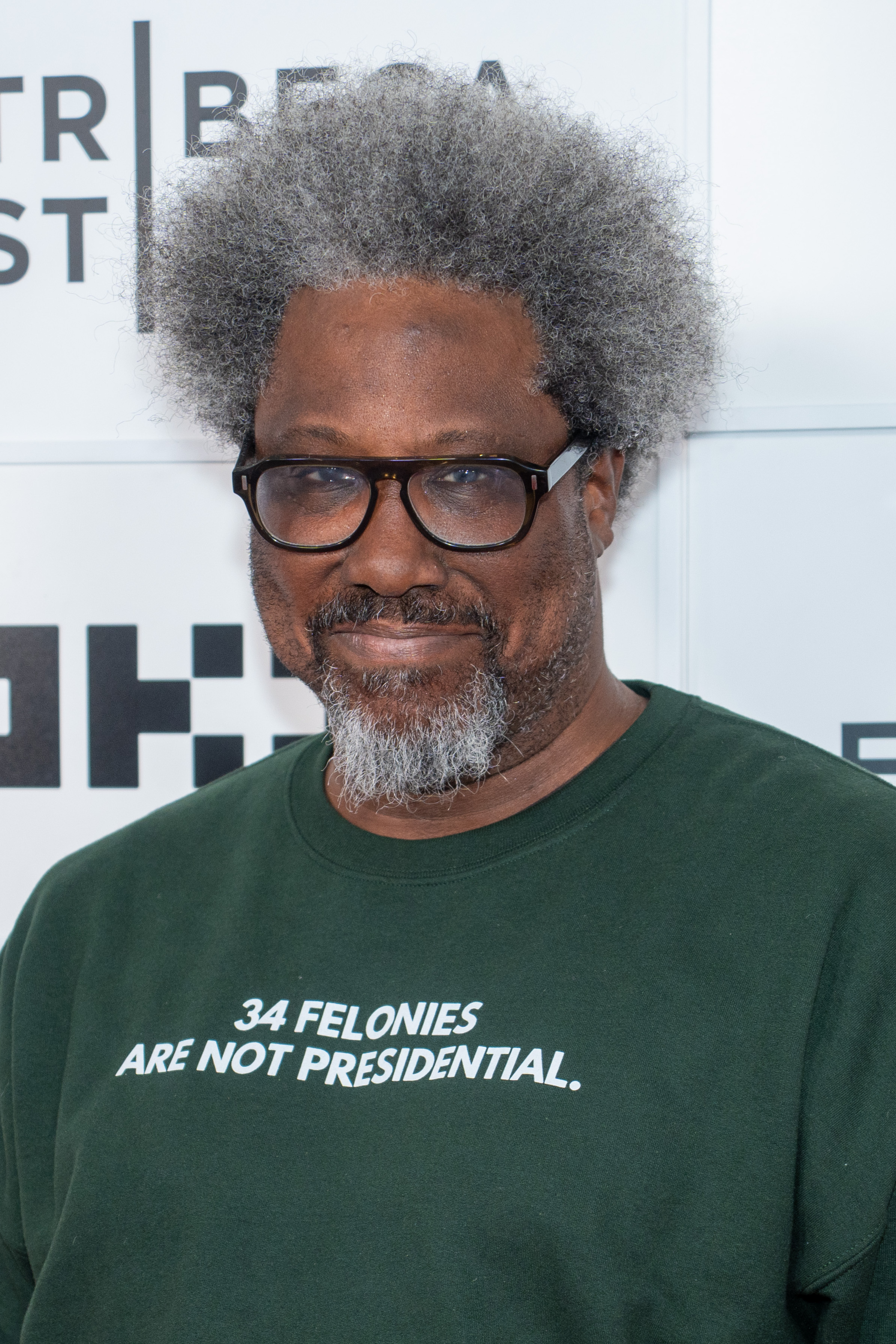
- Bell at the 2026 Tribeca Festival
- Born: Walter Kamau Bell; January 26, 1973 (age 53); Palo Alto, California, U.S.
- Education: University of Chicago Laboratory Schools; University of Pennsylvania
- Notable work: Totally Biased with W. Kamau Bell, United Shades of America, Denzel Washington Is the Greatest Actor of All Time Period
- Spouse: Melissa Hudson Bell (m. 2009)
- Children: 3
- Parent(s): Walter Bell; Janet Cheatham Bell

Comedy career
- Years active: 2005–present
- Medium: Stand-up, television, radio
- Genres: Observational comedy, black comedy, deadpan, satire
- Subjects: Racism, social identity, inequality, American politics
- Website: wkamaubell.com

Walter Kamau Bell (born January 26, 1973) is an American stand-up comic and television host. He hosted the CNN series United Shades of America from 2016 to 2022, and hosted FXX television series Totally Biased with W. Kamau Bell from 2012 to 2013. He is the host of the live radio show and podcast Kamau Right Now on KALW, and also co-hosts the podcasts Denzel Washington Is the Greatest Actor of All Time Period with comedian Kevin Avery and Politically Re-Active with Hari Kondabolu. In 2022, Bell directed and produced the documentary miniseries We Need to Talk About Cosby.

== Early life and education ==
Bell was born in Palo Alto, California, and grew up in Alabama, Boston, and Chicago. He is the only child of Walter Bell, who served as Alabama's Insurance Commissioner and Chairman of Swiss Re America Holding Corporation, and author Janet Cheatham Bell, who founded a self-publishing firm. His middle name, Kamau is ethnically Kikuyu although he is not Kikuyu nor connected to Kenya, where the tribe is indigenous to. Between the ages of five and 12, Bell lived in Boston, Massachusetts, in the Mattapan neighborhood of the city. Bell graduated from the University of Chicago Laboratory Schools and attended the University of Pennsylvania before dropping out. Later he began to pursue a career in comedy and started taking filmmaking classes at Columbia College Chicago.

He is a first cousin once removed of speculative fiction writer N. K. Jemisin.

== Career ==
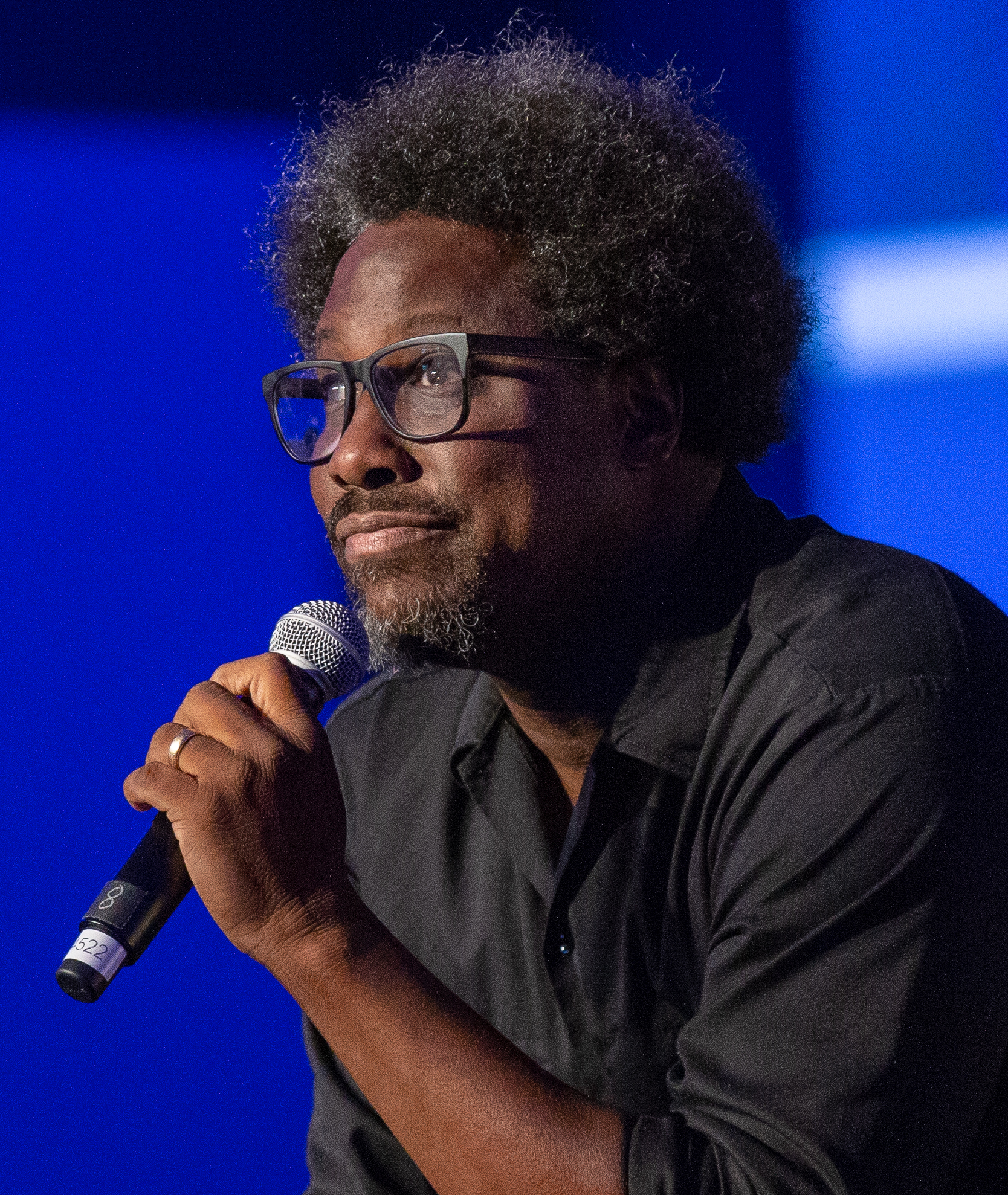
Bell in 2018

After establishing himself as a sociopolitical comedian and community activist based in San Francisco, Bell became a founding member of the comedy collective Laughter Against the Machine and has been featured in a number of prominent podcasts and publications, such as WTF with Marc Maron, Citizen Radio, and Current TV's The War Room with Jennifer Granholm, on which Bell was a regular correspondent.

His first comedy album, One Night Only, was released in 2007. Also in 2007, he developed a one-man show titled The W. Kamau Bell Curve: Ending Racism in About An Hour, "a comedic exploration of the current state of America's racism", which he periodically performs in updated versions.

His follow-up album, Face Full of Flour, was released in 2010, and was named one of the Top 10 Best Comedy Albums of the year by iTunes and Punchline Magazine. From 2011 to 2012, he wrote the blog "Kamau's Komedy Korner" for the San Francisco Weekly. In 2012, Bell was voted San Francisco's best comedian by the SF Weekly, the San Francisco Bay Guardian, and 7×7 Magazine.

His first stand-up comedy TV special, Semi-Prominent Negro, premiered on Showtime on April 29, 2016, and on September 30, 2016, his third full-length album with the same title, was released on Kill Rock Stars.

On November 7, 2017, Bell became the Frank Sinatra Artist-in-Residence of Santa Clara University in Santa Clara, California.

=== Television ===
From 2012 to 2013, Bell hosted a weekly stand up comedy television series, Totally Biased with W. Kamau Bell, first on FX and later on FXX. The show, produced by Chris Rock, provided observational comedy and commentary on social and political issues in addition to celebrity interviews. After the show was cancelled in November 2013, Bell moved back to California from New York.

He was also the host of the award-winning CNN documentary series United Shades of America, which premiered on April 24, 2016. The series has been nominated for several Emmy Awards: from 2016 to 2019 (4 nominations) it was nominated for Outstanding Unstructured Reality Program; in 2021 it was nominated for Outstanding Hosted Nonfiction Series Or Special. Bell was also nominated as Outstanding Host in 2017 and 2018. Bell is Executive Producer of the show, accepting the award for Creative Arts Emmy for Outstanding Unstructured Reality Program in 2017, 2018 and 2019.

The show United Shades of America was renewed for season 3 in 2018. The first episode of the show was aired on April 29, 2018. The season consisted of 8 episodes. The last episode, "Native Hawaii", aired on July 1, 2018. Later in July 2018, Bell was nominated for Primetime Emmy Award for Outstanding Host for a Reality Program for hosting United Shades of America. The show ended after its seventh season on August 21, 2022.

In 2022, Bell directed and produced the documentary miniseries We Need to Talk About Cosby. It explores the life and career of Bill Cosby to his sexual assault cases. It premiered on January 30, 2022, on Showtime, and later won a Peabody Award.

In 2025, Bell competed in the third season of Celebrity Jeopardy!, and ultimately won the tournament. He won $1,000,000 for his chosen charity, DonorsChoose, and an honorary Jeopardy! trophy.

=== Podcast host ===
From 2010 to 2014, Bell co-hosted the podcast The Field Negro Guide to Arts & Culture with Living Colour guitarist Vernon Reid.

Since November 2014, Bell has co-hosted the Earwolf-produced podcast Denzel Washington Is the Greatest Actor of All Time Period with comedian and writer Kevin Avery. In addition to reviewing the films of Denzel Washington one by one, the podcast has also featured interviews with prominent actors, filmmakers, musicians, and comedians including Spike Lee, Ava DuVernay, Jesse Williams, Issa Rae, and Ryan Coogler.

Since January 2016, he has hosted Kamau Right Now, a live radio show and podcast produced by KALW.

Since June 2016, he has also co-hosted the Panoply/First Look Media-produced podcast Politically Re-Active with comedian Hari Kondabolu. The podcast explores American politics and elections with a comedic approach, and includes interviews with activists, journalists, and scholars such as Ian Haney López, Robert Reich, and Pramila Jayapal.

=== Author ===
Bell has authored a number of essays and blog posts about race and racism in American politics and media. In May 2017, he published his first book, The Awkward Thoughts of W. Kamau Bell: Tales of a 6'4, African American, Heterosexual, Cisgender, Left-Leaning, Asthmatic, Black and Proud Blerd, Mama's Boy, Dad, and Stand-Up Comedian. The book is a humorous autobiography interspersed with essays about politics and popular culture.

== Activism ==
Bell sits on the advisory boards of Race Forward, a racial justice think tank (formerly known as the Applied Research Center), and Hollaback!, an anti-harassment organization. In October 2013, he was named the American Civil Liberties Union celebrity ambassador on racial justice.

=== Implicit bias incident in 2015 ===
On January 26, 2015, Bell and his wife Melissa were involved in an incident at the Elmwood Cafe in Berkeley, California, which Bell alleged was racially motivated. Bell reported online that an employee of the cafe told him to "scram", or words to that effect, while he was talking to his white wife and her friends at one of its outdoor tables. He had approached the women from the outside casually dressed (e.g., wearing a knit cap), and the employee, a waitress, assumed he was "selling something," which Bell took as code for "homeless." The cafe owner fired the waitress, and, with Bell, held a community forum to discuss implicit bias and how to improve. Bell's account was eventually featured in an episode of the radio series This American Life titled "Birds & Bees". After the April 2018 arrests of two black men at a Starbucks gained media attention, Bell renewed his criticism of the Elmwood Cafe. He claimed that they had never followed through on the implicit bias training they'd launched together, and had stopped answering his emails. It closed soon after. The cafe reopened a month later with former manager and current co-owner Kara Hammond changing the name to Baker & Commons.

== Personal life ==
Bell started dating Melissa Hudson Bell in 2003, and they married in 2009. They have three daughters.

Bell underwent a vasectomy in May 2019.

== Filmography ==
=== Film ===
	Title	Role	Notes
2017	The Problem with Apu	Himself	
2018	Sorry to Bother You	Other Man in Crowd	
2025	Are We Good?	Himself	

=== Television ===
Year	Title	Director	Producer	Notes
2012–2013	Totally Biased with W. Kamau Bell	No	Yes	Writer; Executive producer
2016	W. Kamau Bell: Semi-Prominent Negro	No	Yes	Writer
2016–2022	United Shades of America	No	Yes	Executive producer
2018	W. Kamau Bell: Private School Negro	No	No	Writer
2018	Cultureshock	Yes	No	Episode: "Bring the Pain"
2022	We Need to Talk About Cosby	Yes	Yes	Executive producer; Director
2023	1000% Me: Growing Up Mixed	Yes	Yes	Executive producer; Director

== Discography ==
- 2007: One Night Only
- 2010: Face Full of Flour
- 2016: Semi-Prominent Negro
