= List of book podcasts =

The following is a list of book podcasts.

== List ==
Podcast	Year	Starring, Narrator(s), or Host(s)	Produced by	Ref
Two Book Nerds Talking	2018–present	Honey Ahmad and Diana Yeong	Renegade Radio	
The Maris Review	2019–2023	Maris Kreizman	Independent	
Confessions with Giles Fraser	2018–2020	Giles Fraser	UnHerd	
The Slowdown	2019–present	Tracy K. Smith and Ada Limón	American Public Media	
Broccoli Book Club	2020–present	Diyora Shadijanova	Broccoli Productions	
Literary Disco	2012–present	Tod Goldberg, Julia Pistell, and Rider Strong	Independent	
Phoebe Reads a Mystery	2020–present	Phoebe	Criminal	
The Guardian Books Podcast	2016–present	Claire Armitstead, Richard Lea and Sian Cain	The Guardian	
Just the Right Book	2016–present	Roxanne Coady	Independent	
Behind the Bookshelves	2018–present	Richard Davies	AbeBooks	
Los Angeles Review of Books	2012–present	Kate Wolf and Medaya Ocher	Los Angeles Review of Books	
Drunk Booksellers	2015–2018	Julia and Christen	Independent	
88 Cups of Tea	2017–2020	Yin Chang	Independent	
Reading Women Podcast	2016–present	Kendra, Sachi, Jaclyn, and Sumaiyya	Independent	
What Should I Read Next?	2016–present	Anne Bogel	Wondery	
The Vintage Podcast	2016–2017	Alex Clark	Independent	
The Book Review	2014–present	Pamela Paul	The New York Times	
Between the Covers	2010–present	David Naimon	Tin House Books and KBOO 90.7FM	
Audio Book Club	2006–2018	Isaac Butler	Slate	
Sugar Calling	2020	Cheryl Strayed	The New York Times	
Bookworm	2021–present	Michael Silverblatt	KCRW	
Bad on Paper	2018–present	Grace Atwood and Becca Freeman	Independent	
Deadline City!	2019–present	Zoraida Córdova and Dhonielle Clayton	Independent	
The Catapult	2014–2016	Jaime Green	Independent	
Culture Gabfest	2017–present	Stephen Metcalf, Dana Stevens and Julia Turner	Slate	
Otherppl	2011–present	Brad Listi	Independent	
By the Book	2017–present	Jolenta Greenberg and Kristen Meinzer	Stitcher Radio	
Backlisted	2015–present	John Mitchinson and Andy Miller	Unbound	
Two Book Minimum	2013–2015	Dan Wilbur	Better Book Titles	
All The Books!	2020–present	Liberty and Tirzah	Book Riot	
Iain Dale’s Book Club	2018–present	Iain Dale	LBC	
Borrowed			London Review of Books	
The Writer's Almanac				
So Many Damn Books	2014–present	Christopher Hermelin and Drew Broussard	Independent	
Dear Book Nerd				
Overdue	2013–present	Craig Getting and Andrew Cunningham	Headgum	
If Books Could Kill	2022–present	Michael Hobbes and Peter Shamshiri	Independent	
The New Yorker: Fiction	2007–present	Deborah Treisman	The New Yorker	
Celebrity Memoir Book Club	2020–present	Claire Parker and Ashley Hamilton	Vox Media Podcast Network	
We'd Like A Word	2019–present	Stevyn Colgan and Paul Waters	Independent	
