= List of awards and nominations received by Rosamund Pike =

Rosamund Pike awards and nominations
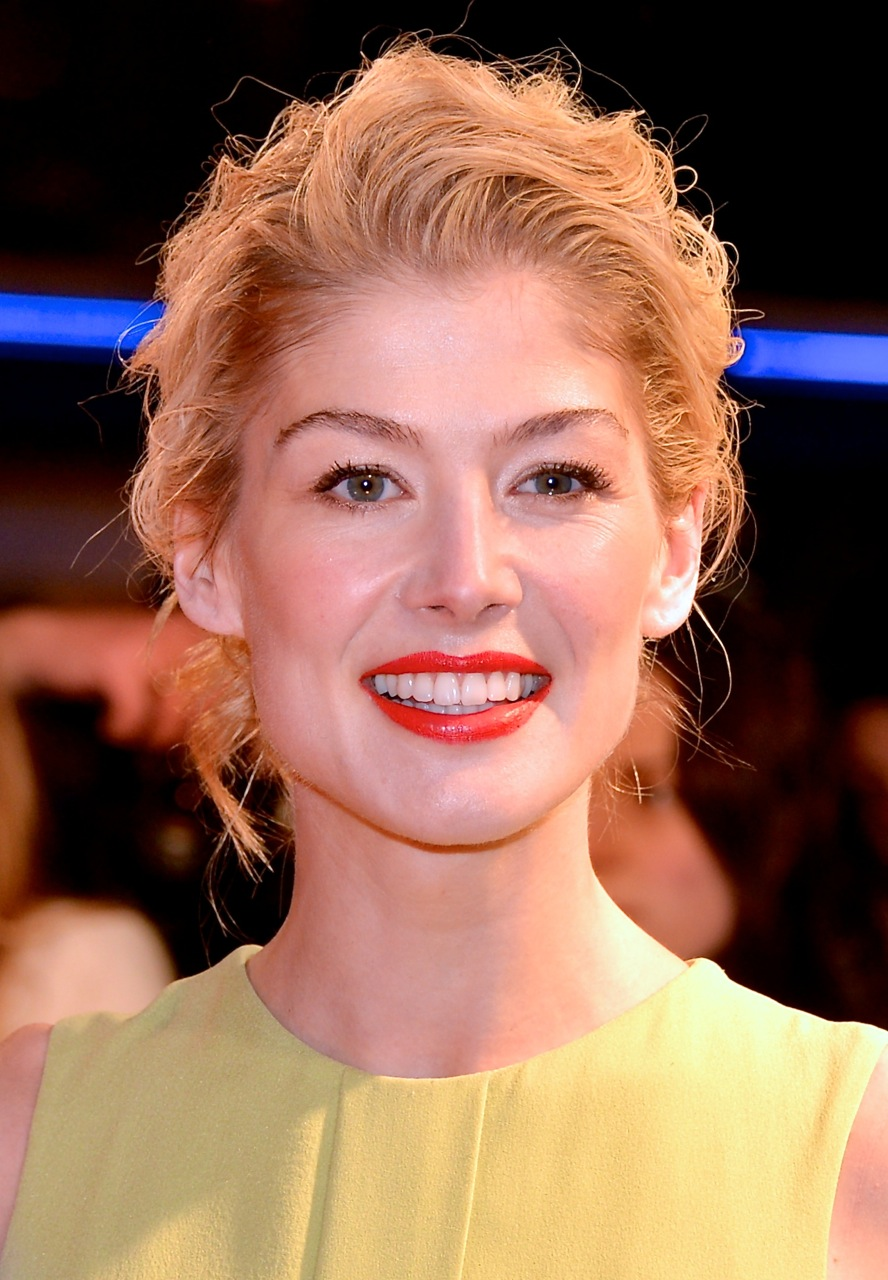
- Pike in 2012
Awards and nominations
Award	Wins	Nominations
Academy Awards	0	1
Actor Awards	0	2
British Academy Film Awards	0	2
Golden Globe Awards	1	4
Primetime Emmy Awards	1	2

English actress and producer Rosamund Pike has received numerous accolades, including a Primetime Emmy Award, Golden Globe Award and British Independent Film Award as well as nominations for an Academy Award, two BAFTA Awards, Critics' Choice Movie Award, and two Actor Awards.

She gained prominence and acclaim for her leading role as Amy Dunne in the David Fincher directed psychological thriller Gone Girl (2014) for which she received nominations for the Academy Award for Best Actress, BAFTA Award for Best Actress, Golden Globe Award for Best Actress in a Motion Picture – Drama, and Actor Award for Outstanding Performance by a Female Actor in a Leading Role. She won the Golden Globe Award for Best Actress – Motion Picture Comedy or Musical for her role as Marla Grayson in the dark comedy thriller I Care a Lot (2020). She also received Golden Globe Award nominations for her roles in A Private War (2019) and Saltburn (2023), the latter of which she received a nomination for the BAFTA Award for Best Actress in a Supporting Role.

== Major associations ==
=== Academy Awards ===
Year	Category	Nominated work	Result	Ref.
2014	Best Actress	Gone Girl	Nominated	

=== Actor Awards ===
Year	Category	Nominated work	Result	Ref.
2010	Outstanding Cast in a Motion Picture	An Education	Nominated	
2015	Outstanding Female Actor in a Leading Role	Gone Girl	Nominated	

=== BAFTA Awards ===
Year	Category	Nominated work	Result	Ref.
British Academy Film Awards
2015	Best Actress in a Leading Role	Gone Girl	Nominated	
2024	Best Actress in a Supporting Role	Saltburn	Nominated	

=== Critics' Choice Awards ===
Year	Category	Nominated work	Result	Ref.
Film
2014	Best Actress	Gone Girl	Nominated	

=== Emmy Awards ===
Year	Category	Nominated work	Result	Ref.
Primetime Emmy Awards
2019	Outstanding Actress in a Short Form Series	State of the Union	Won	
2024	Outstanding Drama Series (as a producer)	3 Body Problem	Nominated	

=== Golden Globe Awards ===
Year	Category	Nominated work	Result	Ref.
2015	Best Actress in a Motion Picture – Drama	Gone Girl	Nominated	
2019	Best Actress in a Motion Picture – Drama	A Private War	Nominated	
2021	Best Actress in a Motion Picture – Musical or Comedy	I Care a Lot	Won	
2024	Best Supporting Actress – Motion Picture	Saltburn	Nominated	

=== Laurence Olivier Awards ===
Year	Category	Nominated work	Result	Ref.
2026	Best Actress	Inter Alia	Won	

== Film critics awards ==
Year	Association	Category	Nominated work	Result	Ref.
2014	Alliance of Women Film Journalists	Best Actress	Gone Girl	Nominated	
2023	Alliance of Women Film Journalists	Best Supporting Actress	Saltburn	Nominated	
2014	Austin Film Critics Association	Best Actress	Gone Girl	Won	
2014	Chicago Film Critics Association	Best Actress	Gone Girl	Nominated	
2014	Dallas-Fort Worth Film Critics Association	Best Actress	Gone Girl	Nominated	
2014	Denver Film Critics Society	Best Actress	Gone Girl	Won	
2024	Denver Film Critics Society	Best Supporting Actress	Saltburn	Nominated	
2014	Detroit Film Critics Society	Best Actress	Gone Girl	Won	
2014	Florida Film Critics Circle Award	Best Actress	Gone Girl	Won	
2023	Houston Film Critics Society	Best Supporting Actress	Saltburn	Nominated	
2014	Kansas City Film Critics Circle	Best Actress	Gone Girl	Won	
2023	Las Vegas Film Critics Society	Best Supporting Actress	Saltburn	Nominated	
2005	London Film Critics' Circle Award	British Supporting Actress of the Year	Pride & Prejudice	Nominated	
2009	London Film Critics' Circle Award	British Supporting Actress of the Year	An Education	Nominated	
2010	London Film Critics' Circle Award	British Supporting Actress of the Year	Made in Dagenham	Nominated	
2010	London Film Critics' Circle Award	British Actress of the Year	Barney's Version	Nominated	
2014	London Film Critics' Circle Award	British Actress of the Year	Gone Girl	Won	
2014	London Film Critics' Circle Award	British Actress of the Year	What We Did on Our Holiday	Won	
2023	London Film Critics' Circle Award	Supporting Actress of the Year	Saltburn	Nominated	
2014	Nevada Film Critics Society	Best Actress	Gone Girl	Won	
2023	New Mexico Film Critics Association	Best Supporting Actress	Saltburn	Nominated	
2015	North Texas Film Critics Association	Best Actress	Gone Girl	Won	
2018	North Texas Film Critics Association	Best Actress	A Private War	Nominated	
2024	North Texas Film Critics Association	Best Supporting Actress	Saltburn	Nominated	
2015	Oklahoma Film Critics Circle	Best Actress	Gone Girl	Won	
2014	Online Film Critics Society	Best Actress	Gone Girl	Won	
2015	Palm Springs International Film Festival	Breakthrough Performance	Gone Girl	Won	
2014	Phoenix Film Critics Society	Best Actress	Gone Girl	Won	
2014	Phoenix Film Critics Society	Breakthrough Performance	Gone Girl	Won	
2014	San Diego Film Critics Society	Best Actress	Gone Girl	Nominated	
2015	Santa Barbara International Film Festival	Virtuoso Award	Gone Girl	Won	
2015	Seattle Film Critics Association	Best Actress	Gone Girl	Won	
2014	St. Louis Film Critics Association	Best Actress	Gone Girl	Won	
2014	Utah Film Critics Association	Best Actress	Gone Girl	Won	
2014	Washington D.C. Area Film Critics Association	Best Actress	Gone Girl	Nominated	

== Miscellaneous accolades ==
=== Audie Awards ===
Year	Category	Nominated work	Result	Ref.
2023	Audie Award for Best Female Narrator	The Eye of the World (1990) by Robert Jordan	Won	
2024	Audie Award for Fantasy	The Dragon Reborn (1991) by Robert Jordan	Won	

=== AACTA Awards ===
Year	Category	Nominated work	Result	Ref.
Australian Academy of Cinema and Television Arts Awards
2014	Best International Actress – Cinema	Gone Girl	Nominated	
2024	Best International Supporting Actress – Cinema	Saltburn	Nominated	

=== British Independent Film Awards ===
Year	Category	Nominated work	Result	Ref.
2004	Best Supporting Actress	The Libertine	Won	
2009	Best Supporting Actress	An Education	Nominated	
2010	Best Supporting Actress	Made in Dagenham	Nominated	

=== Empire Awards ===
Year	Category	Nominated work	Result	Ref.
2002	Best Newcomer	Die Another Day	Won	
2014	Best Actress	Gone Girl	Won	

=== Genie Awards ===
Year	Category	Nominated work	Result	Ref.
2007	Best Actress in a Supporting Role	Fugitive Pieces	Nominated	
2010	Best Actress in a Leading Role	Barney's Version	Nominated	

=== MTV Movie & TV Awards ===
Year	Category	Nominated work	Result	Ref.
2002	Best Trans-Atlantic Performance	Die Another Day	Nominated	
2014	Breakthrough Performance	Gone Girl	Nominated	
2014	Best Scared-As-S**t Performance	Gone Girl	Nominated	
2014	Best Villain	Gone Girl	Nominated	

=== Sant Jordi Awards ===
Year	Category	Nominated work	Result	Ref.
2014	Best Foreign Actress	Gone Girl	Won	

=== Satellite Awards ===
Year	Category	Nominated work	Result	Ref.
2010	Best Supporting Actress – Motion Picture	Barney's Version	Nominated	
2014	Best Actress – Motion Picture	Gone Girl	Nominated	
2018	Best Actress in a Motion Picture – Drama	A Private War	Nominated	
2024	Best Supporting Actress – Motion Picture	Saltburn	Nominated	

=== Saturn Awards ===
Year	Category	Nominated work	Result	Ref.
2014	Best Actress	Gone Girl	Won	
2018	Best Actress	Hostiles	Nominated	

== See also ==
- List of British actors
- List of Academy Award winners and nominees from Great Britain
- List of actors with Academy Award nominations
- List of Primetime Emmy Award winners
- List of Golden Globe winners
