= R.J. Julia Booksellers =

Connecticut independent bookstore

Coordinates: 41.2795°N 72.5950°W

- Industry: Specialty retail
- Founded: 1989
- Founder: Roxanne J. Coady
- Headquarters: Madison, Connecticut, United States
- Number of locations: 1 store
- Area served: New Haven-Milford, CT metropolitan statistical area
- Products: New, used and rare books
- Owner: Roxanne J. Coady
- Number of employees: 30
- Website: http://www.rjjulia.com/

R.J. Julia Booksellers is an independent bookstore based in Madison, Connecticut owned and operated by Roxanne J. Coady, a former tax accountant. R.J. Julia has won multiple awards as a top bookstore in the state of Connecticut, and as a top independent bookseller in the United States.

R.J. Julia Booksellers offers book clubs, a cafe and other events.

== History ==
Coady opened the bookstore in 1989 and named it after her grandmother, who died in a World War II concentration camp. Prior to opening the store, Coady was the national tax director and a partner at BDO Seidman, the chairman of the Tax Division of the New York State Society of CPAs, and the chairman of the Partnership Committee Task Force of the American Institute of CPAs.

In 2005, Roxanne Coady took over management of Elm Street Books in New Canaan, Connecticut.

In 2009, R.J. Julia launched the "Just The Right Book" online gift service. The service sends books each month curated by R.J. Julia staff recommendations personalized based on subscribers' personal preferences.

In 2012, Coady began searching for a buyer for the store. As of 2016, no sale took place, and the shop is off the market.

Later in 2012, R.J. Julia installed a new Espresso Book Machine.

The ABA has reported strong revenue growth among independent bookstores in recent years. This trend has included 10% revenue growth at R.J. Julia in the past five years. In 2016, Coady discussed expansion plans for the business based on that success.

Notable bookstore staff have included the filmmaker Brad Anderson, novelist Mike Attebery, and journalist Virginia Sole-Smith.

In 2021, the bookstore was featured in the film adaptation of The Noel Diary by Richard Paul Evans. This Is Us series star Justin Hartley portrays a bestselling author who returns home at Christmas to settle the estate of his estranged mother.

=== Awards ===
R.J. Julia has won multiple national, state, and local awards from trade associations, news outlets, and other institutions in recognition of its quality as an independent bookseller.

R.J. Julia was named the Publishers Weekly Bookseller of the Year for 1995-1996.

The store then won the Women's National Book Association's Lucile Micheels Pannell Award for excellence in bookselling in 1997.

The store has won Connecticut Magazine's Best of Connecticut award for independent booksellers for many years, including 2014, 2015, and 2016.

The store has also won many awards from CTNow and its New Haven precursor, the New Haven Advocate. Most recently, it won the Best of New Haven Reader's Poll award for Best Book Store in 2016.

Roxanne Coady has personally won multiple awards related to her work at R.J. Julia. In 1998, Coady was named to the Junior Achievement of Southern Connecticut "Free Enterprise and Spirit of Achievement Hall of Fame". Coady was honored along with 24 other Connecticut women at the Eugene O'Neill Theater Center's 2006 Celebration event in memory of then-recently deceased playwright Wendy Wasserstein. In 2010, Coady was honored as a Notable Woman in Business by the Connecticut Women's Hall of Fame. In 2012, Coady was recognized as one of New Haven Living Magazine's 50 Most Influential.

=== Major Author Visits ===
R.J. Julia has become a regular stop on book promotion tours. R.L. Stine, Jane Fonda, Goldie Hawn, Mick Foley, Garrison Keillor, Anne Rice, Tommy Lee, and Chris Russo are just a few guests/authors who have stopped by the store.

Author Anne Rice appeared at the store in 1996 to promote her novel Servant of the Bones. A playing card with her signature is still affixed to the ceiling as you walk in the front entrance.

American radio personality Don Imus and his brother Fred Imus came to the store in 1997 to promote their book Two Guys Four Corners: Great Photographs, Great Times, and a Million Laughs.

Hillary Clinton came in 2014 to promote her memoir Hard Choices.

In February 2016, Kate Hudson came to the store to promote her book Pretty Happy.
