= I Care a Lot =

2020 film by J Blakeson

- Official release poster
- Directed by: J Blakeson
- Written by: J Blakeson
- Produced by: Teddy Schwarzman; Ben Stillman; Michael Heimler; J Blakeson
- Starring: Rosamund Pike; Eiza González; Peter Dinklage; Chris Messina; Dianne Wiest
- Cinematography: Doug Emmett
- Edited by: Mark Eckersley
- Music by: Marc Canham
- Production companies: STXfilms; Black Bear Pictures; Crimple Beck
- Distributed by: Netflix
- Release dates: September 12, 2020 (TIFF); February 19, 2021 (United States)
- Running time: 118 minutes
- Country: United States
- Language: English
- Box office: $1.3 million

I Care a Lot is a 2020 American black comedy crime film written and directed by J Blakeson. The film stars Rosamund Pike, Eiza González, Peter Dinklage, Chris Messina, Macon Blair, Alicia Witt, and Damian Young, with Isiah Whitlock Jr. and Dianne Wiest. The film follows a con woman who makes a living as a court-appointed guardian, seizing and selling the assets of vulnerable elderly people, including the mother of a dangerous mafia boss.

I Care a Lot had its world premiere at the 45th Toronto International Film Festival on September 12, 2020, and was released via streaming on February 19, 2021, through Netflix and Amazon Prime Video, depending on the region. The film received positive reviews from critics, with Pike winning Best Actress in a Motion Picture – Comedy or Musical at the 78th Golden Globe Awards.

== Plot ==
Con artist Marla Grayson makes a living by convincing the justice system to grant her guardianship over elders who she pretends cannot take care of themselves. She places them in an assisted living facility, where they are sedated and lose contact with the outside world. She then sells off their homes and assets, pocketing the proceeds. She and the court deny a man, Mr. Feldstrom, access to his mother after he attempts to force his way into the facility. He later threatens her outside the courthouse, saying that he hopes she is raped and murdered.

Dr. Karen Amos informs Marla about a potential case, a wealthy retiree named Jennifer Peterson with no apparent husband or close family. A judge appoints Marla guardian after she and Dr. Amos falsely testify that Jennifer has dementia, confusion, and loss of mobility. Marla moves Jennifer into assisted living and gets to work selling Jennifer's furniture, car, and home. While rooting through Jennifer's possessions, Marla discovers the key to a safe deposit box. It contains a watch, gold bars, bank notes, and hidden, loose diamonds, which she takes and stashes away.

As Marla's girlfriend and business partner, Fran, oversees the renovation of the house, a cab arrives driven by Alexi Ignatyev, who says he is there to pick up Jennifer. Fran says that Jennifer has moved. Alexi returns to his employer, Roman Lunyov, distressed. Roman, a crime lord, is revealed to be Jennifer's son. He threatens Alexi and orders him to find his mother and report back. Mafia lawyer Dean Ericson offers to pay Marla $150,000 in cash to release Jennifer but she refuses, willing to do it only if she is paid $5 million. He threatens Marla and takes her to court. The judge dismisses the case as Ericson cannot prove Jennifer hired him.

Fran discovers "Jennifer Peterson" is an identity stolen from an infant who died of polio. When Jennifer refuses to tell Marla her real identity, Marla teams up with property manager Sam Rice and withdraws filling many of Jennifer's basic needs. Finding his mother's safe deposit box rifled, Roman sends three thugs to Jennifer's facility to take her. This effort fails, and Marla helps police apprehend Alexi, who is one of the men. Fran's police contact tells them that Alexi is the sibling of two other mafia bosses who supposedly died in a fire. Having failed to rescue his mother, Roman has Dr. Amos killed at her office. After hearing this news, Marla and Fran move into an unsold property of a previous victim. Jennifer is baited into attacking Marla when she visits the facility and is moved to a psychiatric ward.

Marla is tranquilized and kidnapped while Fran is attacked in their home. Marla is taken to Roman and demands $10 million to arrange Jennifer's release. He refuses, and his associates knock her out with chloroform and send her in a car into a lake. She escapes and returns home to find Fran beaten unconscious as gas fills the house. They escape an explosion and flee to another unsold property. Marla shows Fran the diamonds she has hidden there. She offers Fran a choice: they can use the diamonds to start a new life elsewhere, or they can get revenge.

Marla and Fran track down Roman and kidnap him. They force drugs into his body, burn his car, and leave him on a forest trail. He will be discovered high on drugs and with no identification. Roman is discovered by a jogger, and is rescued. With no identity, Roman is designated a John Doe by a judge, who appoints Marla as Roman's legal guardian. Marla visits Roman and offers to release him and Jennifer from her guardianship for $10 million.

Instead, Roman offers her a partnership in a global business based on her scam. She accepts and, using his money and connections, becomes a powerful, wealthy CEO. Roman is reunited with Jennifer, while Marla marries Fran.

While leaving a TV interview, Marla is shot by Feldstrom. He says that his mother died alone in the facility because no one would let him see her. As Feldstrom is arrested, Fran cries out for help as Marla bleeds to death in her arms.

== Cast ==
- Rosamund Pike as Marla Grayson
- Eiza González as Fran
- Peter Dinklage as Roman Lunyov
- Dianne Wiest as Jennifer Peterson
- Chris Messina as Dean Ericson
- Isiah Whitlock Jr. as Judge Lomax
- Macon Blair as Feldstrom
- Alicia Witt as Dr. Karen Amos
- Damian Young as Sam Rice
- Nicholas Logan as Alexi Ignatyev
- Ralph Ayala as Orderly

== Production ==
It was announced in May 2019 that Rosamund Pike had been cast to star in the film, which would be written and directed by J Blakeson. Peter Dinklage and Eiza González were added in June. In July 2019, Chris Messina and Dianne Wiest joined the cast, and filming began the same month. Scenes were shot in Dedham, Massachusetts, including at the Norfolk County Registry of Deeds.

== Release ==
The film had its world premiere at the Toronto International Film Festival on September 12, 2020. Netflix acquired distribution rights to the film in select countries and regions, including the United States, France, Germany, Latin America, South Africa, the Middle East, and India. Amazon Studios acquired the rights to release it on Amazon Prime Video in Australia, Canada, Ireland, Italy, New Zealand, and the United Kingdom through Black Bear's international distributor STX. It was released on both services on February 19, 2021. Over its first weekend of release, the film was the most-watched on Netflix, then second-most in its sophomore frame. On April 20, 2021, Netflix revealed that the film had been watched by 56 million households. It received a limited international release and grossed $1.3 million.

== Reception ==
On the review aggregator website Rotten Tomatoes, 79% of 235 critics' reviews are positive, with an average rating of 7.0/10. The website's consensus reads: "A searing swipe at late-stage capitalism, I Care a Lot is an exhilarating, pitch-black comedy with a wicked performance from Rosamund Pike." Metacritic, which uses a weighted average, assigned the film a score of 66 out of 100, based on 39 critics, indicating "generally favorable" reviews.

Owen Gleiberman, writing for Variety, praised writer and director J Blakeson, whom he compared to Alfred Hitchcock, stating that "when he finally gets around to staging an action sequence, it's a doozy [...] because he takes his time and has you hanging on every moment". For Empire, Terri White wrote that Blakeson "doesn't always remain in full control of the story and tone, [but] the ride is so wild and entertaining that it doesn't particularly matter", and gave the film four stars out of five. Slant Magazine's Chuck Bowen gave the film two stars and a half out of four, and wrote that "Blakeson means for us to champion Marla as a feminist icon for a while, though he deflates this potential moral idiocy with an ironic ending."

Various critics praised Pike for her performance as con artist Marla Grayson. While the Associated Press said "Pike pulls something off that few else could as a protagonist," Entertainment Weekly wrote that she delivered her best performance as a villain since Gone Girl in 2014.

Writing for Out, Mey Rude said that I Care a Lot was "almost a perfect lesbian movie", praising the "sinister glee" Pike brings to what "could've been an all-time great lesbian sex symbol" role and the "great chemistry" that she and Gonzalez have as the story "keeps escalating and twisting and turning". However, she strongly criticised the "undignified and blunt" ending. The New York Times said that the film was an "unexpectedly gripping thriller that seesaws between comedy and horror", praising it for being "cleverly written and wonderfully cast", and for its "ice-pick dialogue" and introduction of Peter Dinklage as Roman Lunyov.

Conversely, Adam Graham of The Detroit News gave the film a "D" and said that I Care a Lot was a "misguided black comedy", as viewers didn't have a way to relate to the character of Marla Grayson. The Chicago Tribune's, Michael Phillips gave the film two stars and wrote that while "the acting's uniformly strong [...] the script is distressingly weak." Mae Abdulbaki from Screen Rant gave a mixed review, lauding the performances from the ensemble cast, but writing that "there is something completely missing from I Care a Lot that makes it a hard pill to swallow." In his review for The Boston Globe, Ty Burr rated the film 2 out of 5 stars and noted that "in Rosamund Pike’s chilly, hollow central performance you may find it difficult to care at all." Anthony Lane of The New Yorker criticized I Care a Lot for being "pleased with its cynicism" and constantly pushing boundaries of tastelessness. He notes the film sidelines the elderly characters and their significance, focusing more on the heartless actions of the protagonist. Joe Morgenstern described the film as a "shallow comedy" and as "deeply dislikable" and said "The film is arch, but no triumph, an airless exercise in mistrusting its audience, and all of it is accompanied by pummeling music that sounds like a Vangelis wannabe recorded during a brownout."

Glamour wrote that the movie "mixes the psychopathy of Gone Girl's Amy Dunne, the dehumanizing capitalism of American Psycho, and the sapphic energy of A Simple Favor".

== See also ==
- List of films featuring psychopaths and sociopaths
