= Bookworm (radio show) =

KCRW show hosted by Michael Silverblatt

- Running time: 30 minutes
- Country of origin: United States of America
- Language: American English
- Home station: KCRW
- Hosted by: Michael Silverblatt
- Original release: 1989
- Website: kcrw.com/bookworm

Bookworm is an interview radio show hosted by Michael Silverblatt and produced by KCRW. The show featured interviews and discussions with authors and other literary figures. The show ran from 1989 to 2022, syndicated nationally on NPR.

== Background ==
The show has been running since 1989 and has since become available as a podcast. Silverblatt was unpaid for the first five years that he hosted the show until receiving the "Lannan Literary Grant" from the Lannan Foundation. The show aired on KCRW-FM (89.9) in Santa Monica on Thursdays at 2:30pm. The show was also available on WNYC Radio 820-AM at 4:30pm on Sundays. The show is syndicated to more than fifty radio stations throughout the United States. According to Believer Magazine, Silverblatt has interviewed over twelve hundred writers. David Foster Wallace was interviewed on the show and a tribute episode was later recorded after his death. The show used the song "You (Are A Human Animal)" as the theme song for twenty-one years until Sparks created a new theme song for the show in 2010.

== Reception ==
Sarah Fay praised the show saying that Bookworm "reminds us that the literary interview can function as art." Neil Denny commented on the show saying that "Bookworm has become a fixture of the US literary scene." Simon Lowe of The Guardian praised the show saying that it "is a rare pleasure and unlike any other author interview you will hear." Dana Dickey of PureWow recommended the show saying that "You'll feel smarter just by listening." A Public Space called the show "the country's premier literary talk show" in 2018 when Silverblatt received the Deborah Pease Prize.

== See also ==
- List of book podcasts
