= Rosamund Pike =

British actress and producer (born 1979)

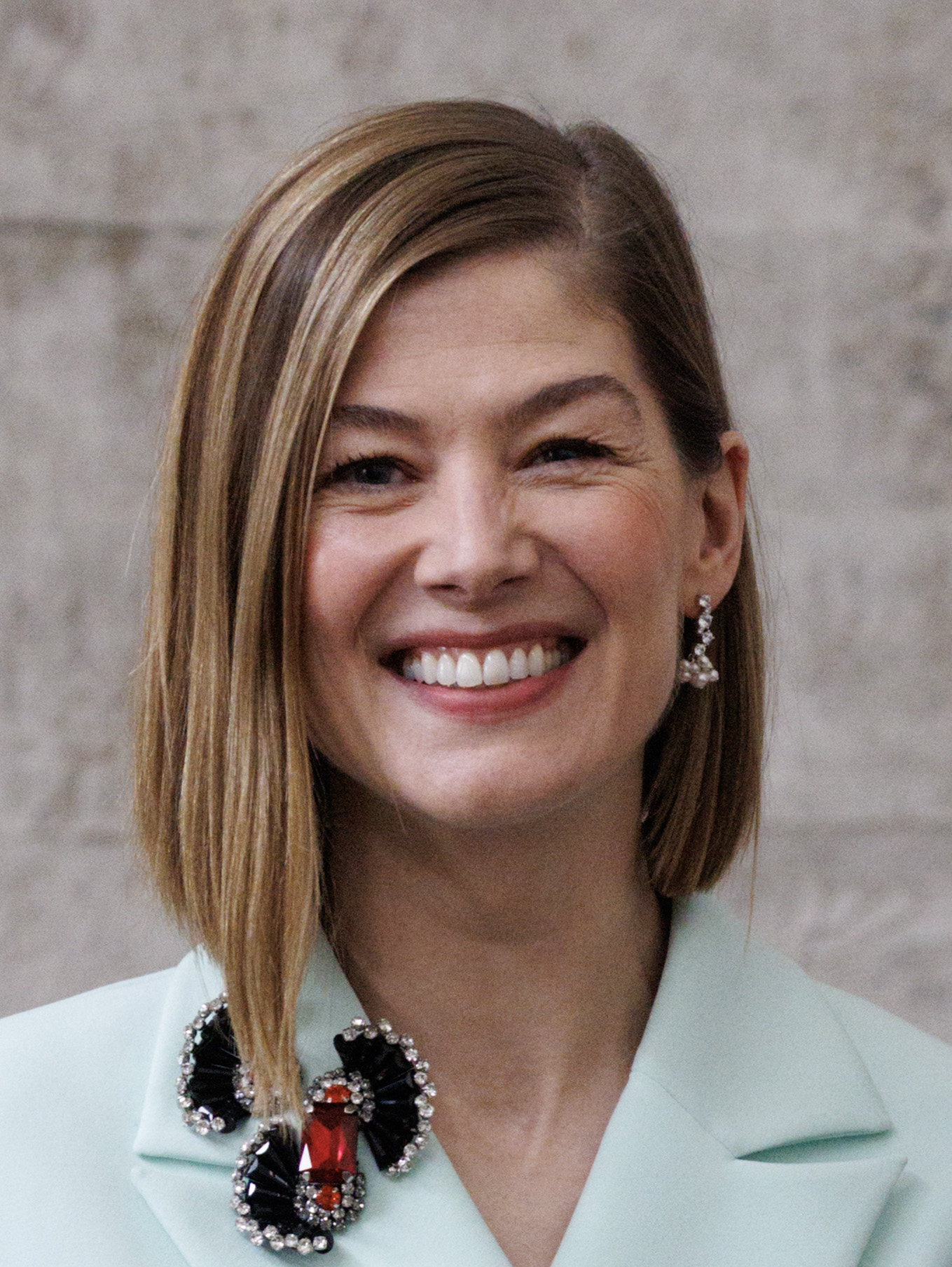
- Pike in 2026
- Born: Rosamund Mary Ellen Pike; 1979 (age 46–47) (Note: On her official Instagram account, she captioned that 27 January is not her accurate birth date, but confirmed she was born in 1979.); Hammersmith, London, England
- Education: Badminton School; University of Oxford
- Occupations: Actress; producer
- Years active: 1998–present
- Partner: Robie Uniacke (2009–present)
- Children: 2
- Awards: Full list

Rosamund Mary Ellen Pike (born 1979) is a British actress and producer. Known for her portrayals of complex and morally ambiguous women in independent cinema and psychological thrillers, her accolades include a Primetime Emmy Award, a Golden Globe Award and a Laurence Olivier Award, in addition to nominations for an Academy Award and two BAFTAs.

A graduate of the University of Oxford, Pike drew early recognition from her work in stage productions, including Romeo and Juliet at the National Youth Theatre, before her professional debut as Bond girl Miranda Frost in Die Another Day (2002). Supporting roles in the period dramas Pride & Prejudice (2005), An Education (2009) and Made in Dagenham (2010) were followed by further mainstream film credits including Johnny English Reborn (2011), Wrath of the Titans (2012), Jack Reacher (2012) and The World's End (2013). For her portrayal of Amy Dunne in the psychological thriller Gone Girl (2014), Pike earned a nomination for the Academy Award for Best Actress.

Pike's career further progressed with her portrayals of Ruth Williams Khama in the biopic A United Kingdom (2016) and Marie Colvin in the war film A Private War (2018), and she won the Golden Globe Award for Best Actress for her leading role in the black comedy I Care a Lot (2020). During this period, she won the Primetime Emmy Award for Outstanding Actress for her role in the comedy miniseries State of the Union (2019). After starring as Moiraine Damodred in the Amazon Prime Video fantasy series The Wheel of Time (2021–2025), she received renewed acclaim and awards nominations for her performance in the satirical thriller Saltburn (2023). For producing the Netflix science fiction series 3 Body Problem (2024), Pike earned a nomination for the Primetime Emmy Award for Outstanding Drama Series. In 2025, she returned to the stage for the first time in 15 years with her performance in the Royal National Theatre production Inter Alia, for which she won the Laurence Olivier Award for Best Actress.

== Early life and education ==
Rosamund Mary Ellen Pike was born in 1979 in Hammersmith, London, the only child of opera singers Julian Pike and Caroline Friend. She was privately educated at Badminton School in Bristol. While appearing as Juliet in a production of Romeo and Juliet at the National Youth Theatre, she was scouted by an agent, Dallas Smith ("the most genuine and long-lasting relationship in my professional life"), who helped her embark upon a professional career. After being turned down by every stage school to which she applied, she gained a place to study English literature at the University of Oxford where she was an undergraduate student at Wadham College, Oxford. She graduated with an upper second-class honours degree in 2001, having taken a year off to pursue her acting career, gaining stage experience in David Hare's Skylight, Arthur Miller's All My Sons, and several plays by William Shakespeare.

== Career ==
=== 1998–2013: Early roles and breakthrough ===
While she was still at Oxford, Pike acted in and directed various plays, including one by Simon Chesterman who was then a graduate student. She made appearances on British television shows, including A Rather English Marriage (1998), Wives and Daughters (1999) and the miniseries Love in a Cold Climate (2001). She appeared as Sarah Beaumont in an episode of the series Foyle's War. After graduating, she was offered a role as a Bond girl and MI6 agent assigned to aid James Bond in Die Another Day, and appeared in the show Bond Girls Are Forever and, shortly afterwards, the BAFTA tribute to the James Bond film series. She was the first Bond girl to have attended Oxford. Pike played Elizabeth Malet in The Libertine (2004), co-starring Johnny Depp, which won her the British Independent Film Award for Best Supporting Actress. In the same year, she portrayed Rose in Promised Land, a film about Israel, and starred as scientist Samantha Grimm in film Doom, based upon the Doom video game series. On making Doom Pike said in 2026: "I was just out of my comfort zone, out of my league, out of my depth. It was an absolute bomb. I mean, I probably could have ended my career. It was just probably one of the worst films ever made. I mean, it was a catastrophe. I don't read the reviews, but you get the sense like you're lucky to have survived that one."

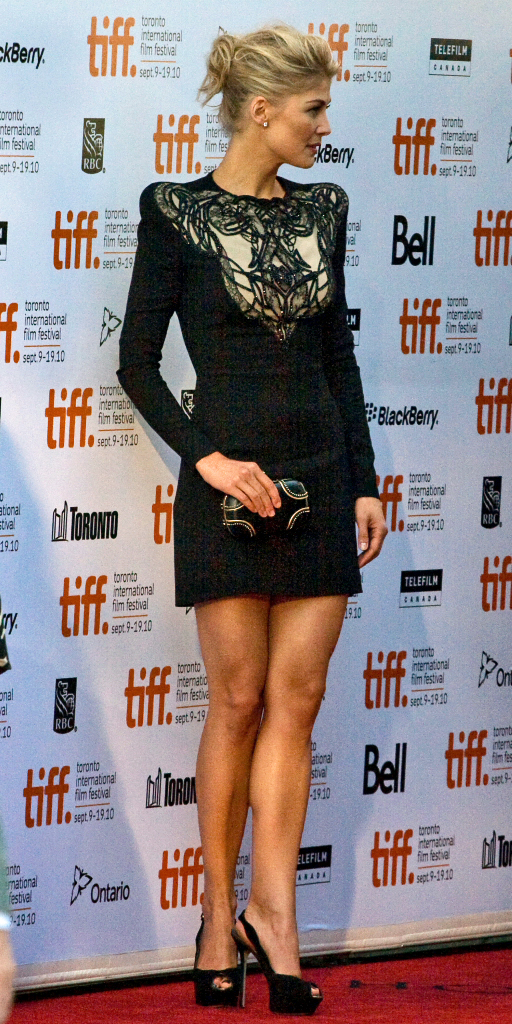
Pike at the premiere of Barney's Version during the 2010 Toronto International Film Festival

In 2005, she appeared as Jane, the elder sister of Elizabeth (played by Keira Knightley), in Pride & Prejudice. Pike starred in the film adaptation of Anne Michaels' novel Fugitive Pieces. She starred as a successful attorney in the film Fracture, opposite Anthony Hopkins and Ryan Gosling. Pike was a judge at the Costa Book Awards in 2008. Her stage credits include Hitchcock Blonde by Terry Johnson and Tennessee Williams' Summer and Smoke, both in London's West End, and Gas Light at London's Old Vic Theatre. In 2009, she played the title character in Madame De Sade during the Donmar's West End season.

In 2010, she appeared in the British film Made in Dagenham and in the Canadian film Barney's Version in which she plays Miriam. That same year, she starred in a production of Hedda Gabler on a UK tour. Pike recorded voicework for a lead role in the film Jackboots on Whitehall (2010) and lent her voice to a series of James Bond audio books, narrating The Spy Who Loved Me. Also in 2010, Pike voiced the character Pussy Galore in the BBC Radio 4 adaptation of Fleming's Goldfinger. In 2011, she played the character Kate Sumner in the Bond spoof film Johnny English Reborn, playing a psychologist and English's love interest. The film is a sequel to the 2003 film Johnny English.

In 2012, she played the role of Queen Andromeda in the fantasy epic Wrath of the Titans. She replaced Alexa Davalos, who had played the role in Clash of the Titans and had dropped out due to a scheduling conflict. Taking the role in Wrath of the Titans meant she had to drop out of consideration for a role in Man of Steel. Although the film was not well received by critics, it grossed over $300 million and critics considered her performance to be one of the film's highlights. She starred as Helen Rodin, the female lead alongside Tom Cruise in the thriller Jack Reacher, an adaptation of the novel One Shot by Lee Child. The film opened to positive critical reception and grossed over $218 million. The following year she had a supporting role in The World's End (2013).

=== 2014–present: Gone Girl and other roles ===
Pike starred in the David Fincher-directed psychological thriller Gone Girl (2014), a film adaptation of Gillian Flynn's novel of the same name. Playing opposite Ben Affleck, Pike was cast as Amy Dunne, a woman who goes missing on her fifth wedding anniversary. Fincher said Pike was his first choice for the role because he wanted someone who was not widely known and because he found her enigmatic and could not easily read her. The film was a box office hit, earning over $356 million in global ticket sales. The movie premiered at the 52nd New York Film Festival where the film and Pike's performance earned widespread acclaim from critics.

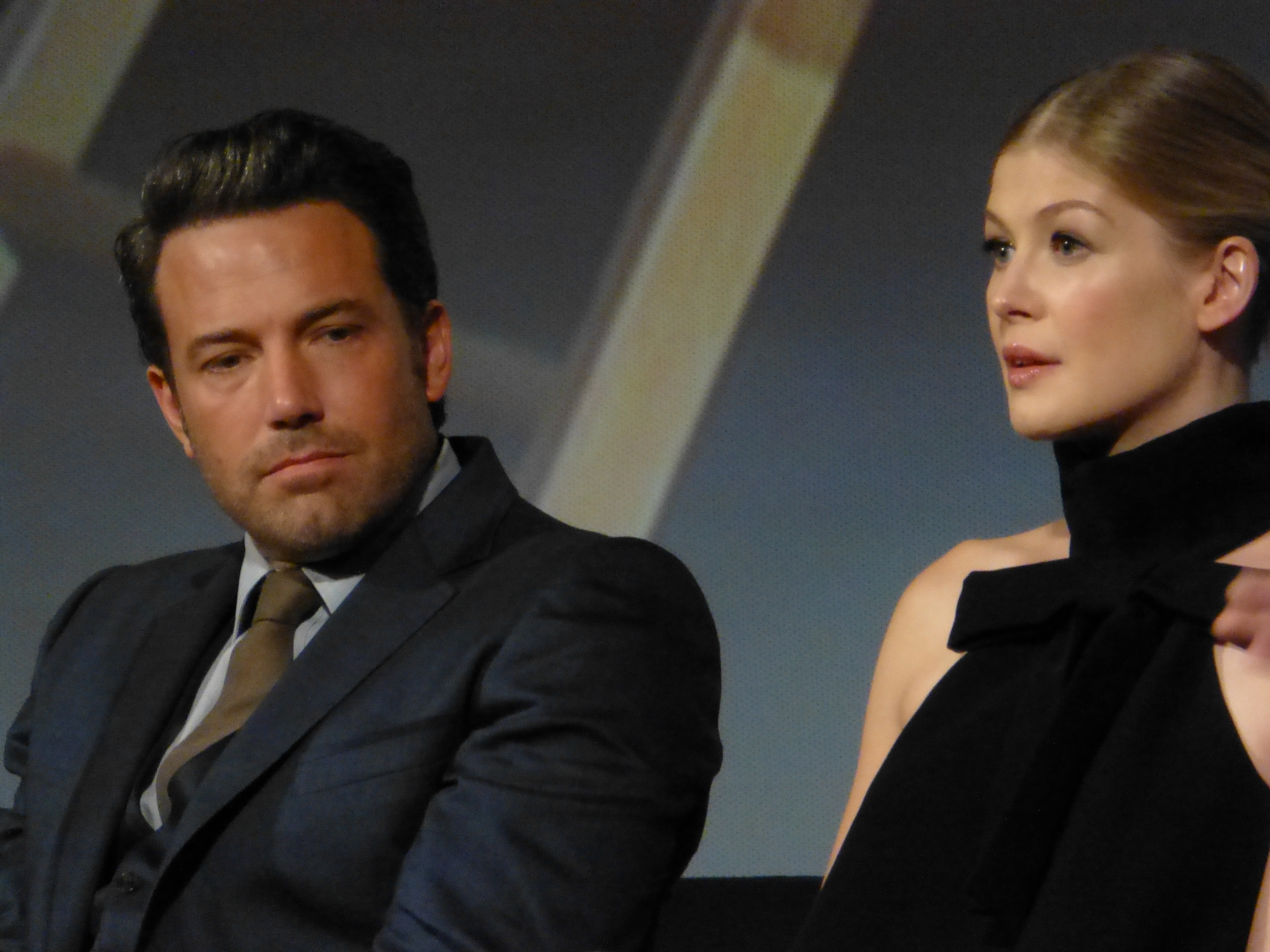
Pike and actor Ben Affleck attending the premiere of Gone Girl at the 52nd New York Film Festival in October 2014

Richard Lawson of Vanity Fair wrote that the film is "Smartly shot, detailed ... and performed" and called Pike's portrayal "a star-makingly good performance, spellbinding in its operatic mix of tones and temperatures." Todd McCarthy of The Hollywood Reporter said that she "is powerful and commanding ... Physically and emotionally, Pike looks to have immersed herself in this profoundly calculating character, and the results are impressive." For her performance, she received numerous nominations including the Academy Award for Best Actress, the BAFTA Award for Best Actress in a Leading Role, the Critics' Choice Movie Award for Best Actress, the Golden Globe Award for Best Actress in a Motion Picture – Drama and the Screen Actors Guild Award for Outstanding Actress in a Leading Role.

From 2015, she voiced Lady Penelope Creighton-Ward in the remake of Thunderbirds Are Go produced by ITV in conjunction with Weta Workshop. In February 2016, she starred in the music video for "Voodoo in My Blood" by Massive Attack, inspired by the subway scene with Isabelle Adjani in the film Possession (1981) directed by Andrzej Żuławski. In 2017, she took the role of The Woman in the short film The Human Voice, written and directed by Patrick Kennedy and based on the play La voix humaine by Jean Cocteau; for her work, she won Best Actress at the Oxford International Film Festival.

In 2018, Pike was cast as war correspondent Marie Colvin in A Private War, directed by Matthew Heineman and based on "Marie Colvin's Private War", a Vanity Fair article by Marie Brenner. She was nominated for a Golden Globe Award and Satellite Award for Best Actress in a Motion Picture – Drama. In 2019, she was cast as Moiraine in Amazon Prime Video's adaptation of Robert Jordan's fantasy epic The Wheel of Time, which was released in November 2021. Her other films include the thriller The Informer and the biopic Radioactive, in which she played Marie Curie.

In 2021, Pike starred as con artist Marla Grayson in the crime thriller I Care a Lot, directed by J Blakeson and co-starring Peter Dinklage, Eiza González and Dianne Wiest. Her performance received universal acclaim; David Rooney of The Hollywood Reporter said "Pike brings crisp efficiency and dead-eyed amorality to a legal conservator", and ABC News journalist Peter Travers wrote that "Pike makes a feast of the role". At the 78th Golden Globe Awards, she won the Golden Globe Award for Best Actress in a Motion Picture – Comedy or Musical.

In 2021, Pike starred in and executive produced the eight-episode historical fiction podcast Edith!. The scripted podcast dramatises a period during the Woodrow Wilson presidency when Wilson was incapacitated by a stroke and First Lady Edith Wilson took the reins of power while he recovered. Clark Gregg plays the role of President Wilson and Esther Povitsky portrays Trudy Grayson, the First Lady's best friend. In 2021, Pike narrated the audiobook of Paula Hawkins' novel, A Slow Fire Burning. She also voiced an audiobook of The Eye of the World, the first book in the Wheel of Time series. In July 2022 it was announced that she would also voice audiobook versions of The Great Hunt and The Dragon Reborn. In 2022, it was announced that Pike would star in Emerald Fennell's second feature film, Saltburn.

Pike was an executive producer on the Netflix series 3 Body Problem, based on the novel The Three-Body Problem. In November 2023, Pike began filming on Hallow Road by Babak Anvari. In April 2024 it was revealed Pike had joined the cast of In the Grey by Guy Ritchie. In May 2024 it was announced Pike had joined the cast of Now You See Me: Now You Don't. In September 2024 it was announced Pike would star as the lead in the Netflix series Thumblite, centred on Silicon Valley. In October Pike was cast alongside Sacha Baron Cohen in the Netflix film Ladies First by Thea Sharrock. Pike made her Royal National Theatre debut in summer 2025 in the play Inter Alia by Suzie Miller.

== Personal life ==
=== Relationships ===
While at Oxford, Pike was in a relationship for two years with Simon Woods. They later played the lovers Jane Bennet and Charles Bingley in the 2005 film Pride & Prejudice. She then became engaged to the director of that production, Joe Wright, but their engagement ended in 2008.

Since December 2009, Pike has been in a relationship with businessman Robie Uniacke, who is 18 years older than her. In 2015, when they visited China to promote Gone Girl, Pike mentioned that Uniacke had given her a Chinese name 裴淳华 (traditional Chinese: 裴淳華, pinyin: Péi Chúnhuá, IPA: [pʰěɪ ʈʂʰwə̌n.xwǎ]) and that, being admirers of Chinese culture, they would like the media to use that as her Chinese name rather than using the transliteration of her English name.

The couple have two sons, who are fluent in Mandarin. Uniacke, Pike, and their sons moved to Prague as she filmed The Wheel of Time TV series.

=== Activism ===
In 2015, Pike signed an open letter for which the ONE Campaign had been collecting signatures; the letter was addressed to Angela Merkel and Nkosazana Dlamini-Zuma, urging them to focus on women, as they would serve as the head of the Group of Seven (G7) and the African Union (AU), respectively, which would start to set the priorities for development funding in preparation for a United Nations (UN) summit in September 2015, which was intended to establish new development goals for the next generation.

In 2021, Pike invested in and served as creative director for the psychedelic-inspired meditation app Lumenate, which purports to guide the user into an altered state of consciousness with flashing lights.

Also in 2021, Pike became the first ambassador for Mines Advisory Group, the Nobel Peace Prize-winning NGO that assists people affected by landmines, unexploded ordnance and small arms and light weapons.

In a 2023 interview with The Guardian, Pike expressed a belief that "we're all being conned by the wellness industry" and "this idea that it's no longer enough to be healthy and we have to be 'well' is something that needs to be interrogated". She said "it's so seductive because it's in pursuit of things that people are ashamed to want" and called it "really dangerous".

== Acting credits ==
Key
†	Denotes films that have not yet been released

=== Film ===
Year	Title	Role	Notes	Ref.
2002	Die Another Day	Miranda Frost		
2004	Promised Land	Rose		
2004	The Libertine	Elizabeth Malet		
2005	Pride & Prejudice	Jane Bennet		
2005	Doom	Dr. Samantha Grimm		
2007	Fracture	Nikki Gardner		
2007	Fugitive Pieces	Alex		
2009	An Education	Helen		
2009	Surrogates	Maggie Greer		
2009	Yesterday We Were in America	Narrator	Documentary	
2010	Burning Palms	Dedra Davenport		
2010	Jackboots on Whitehall	Daisy (voice)		
2010	Barney's Version	Miriam Grant-Panofsky		
2010	Made in Dagenham	Lisa Hopkins		
2011	The Organ Grinder's Monkey	Rochelle	Short film	
2011	Johnny English Reborn	Kate Sumner		
2011	The Big Year	Jessica		
2012	Wrath of the Titans	Queen Andromeda		
2012	Jack Reacher	Helen Rodin		
2013	The Devil You Know	Zoe Hughes		
2013	The World's End	Sam Chamberlain		
2014	A Long Way Down	Penny		
2014	Hector and the Search for Happiness	Clara		
2014	What We Did on Our Holiday	Abi McLeod		
2014	Gone Girl	Amy Dunne		
2015	Return to Sender	Miranda Wells		
2016	A United Kingdom	Ruth Williams Khama		
2017	The Man with the Iron Heart	Lina Heydrich		
2017	Hostiles	Rosalee Quaid		
2018	Beirut	Sandy Crowder		
2018	Entebbe	Brigitte Kuhlmann		
2018	The Human Voice	Woman	Short film	
2018	A Private War	Marie Colvin		
2019	The Informer	Erica Wilcox		
2019	Radioactive	Marie Curie		
2020	I Care a Lot	Marla Grayson		
2021	Evidence of it All	Narrator (voice)	Short film	
2023	Saltburn	Elspeth Catton		
2025	Hallow Road	Mother		
2025	Now You See Me: Now You Don't	Veronika Vanderberg		
2026	In the Grey	Bobby Sheen		
2026	Ladies First	Alex Fox		
2027	Wife & Dog †	TBA	Post-production	

=== Television ===
Year	Title	Role	Notes	Ref.
1998	A Rather English Marriage	Celia	Television film	
1999	Wives and Daughters	Lady Harriet Cumnor	3 episodes	
2000	Trial & Retribution	Lucy	Episode: "Trial and Retribution IV (Part 1)"	
2001	Love in a Cold Climate	Fanny	2 episodes	
2002	Bond Girls Are Forever	Herself	Documentary	
2002	Foyle's War	Sarah Beaumont	Episode: "The German Woman"	
2008	The Tower	Olivia Wynn	Episode: "Pilot"	
2009	Freefall	Anna	Television film	
2011	Women in Love	Gudrun Brangwen	2 episodes	
2015–2020	Thunderbirds Are Go	Lady Penelope Creighton-Ward / Captain Ridley O'Bannon (voices)	39 episodes	
2018	Watership Down	The Black Rabbit of Inlé (voice)	2 episodes	
2019	State of the Union	Louise	10 episodes	
2019–2024	Moominvalley	Moominmamma (voice)	Main cast	
2019–2021	Archibald's Next Big Thing	Narrator (voice)		
2020	Thomas & Friends	Duchess (voice)	Episode: "Thomas and the Royal Engine"	
2020	The Windsors: A Royal Dynasty	Narrator (voice)	6 episodes	
2021–2025	The Wheel of Time	Moiraine Damodred	Main cast; also producer	
2024	3 Body Problem	—	Executive producer only	

=== Theatre ===
Year	Title	Role	Theatre	Ref.
2003	Hitchcock Blonde	The Blonde	Royal Court Theatre Lyric Theatre, West End	
2006	Summer and Smoke	Alma Winemiller	Nottingham Playhouse	
2007	Gas Light	Bella Manningham	The Old Vic	
2009	Madame de Sade	Madame de Sade	Wyndham's Theatre	
2010	Hedda Gabler	Hedda Gabler	Theatre Royal, Bath	
2025	Inter Alia	Jessica Parks	Lyttelton Theatre, Royal National Theatre (23 July – 13 September 2025)	
2026	Inter Alia	Jessica Parks	Wyndham's Theatre, West End (19 March – 20 June 2026) Music Box Theatre, Broadway (10 November 2026 – 21 February 2027)	

=== Music videos ===
Year	Artist	Title	Ref.
2016	Massive Attack feat. Young Fathers	"Voodoo in My Blood"	

=== Radio ===
Year	Title	Role	Notes	Ref.
2010	Goldfinger	Pussy Galore		

=== Podcasts ===
Year	Podcast	Episode	Role	Notes	Ref.
2021	Edith!	All Episodes	First Lady Edith Wilson	Main role; also executive producer	
2023	People Who Knew Me	All Episodes	Connie Prynne/Emily Morris		
2023	Mother, Neighbor, Russian Spy	All Episodes	Narrator		
2026	F1:Back At Base S3	All Episodes	Host		

=== Video games ===
Year	Title	Role	Notes	Ref.
2022	Evidence 111	Mrs. Keswille (voice)	English version of a Czech video game	

=== Audiobooks ===
- Restless (2007) ISBN 978-0747586203 ASIN B000JCESY8
- The Magician's Apprentice (Abridged) (2009) ISBN 978-1841495903 ASIN B00JHNTY3U
- The Bolter (2009) ISBN 978-0307476425 ASIN B00JHNU2EA
- The Spy Who Loved Me (Unabridged) (2014) ISBN 978-0670665938 ASIN B00977PYTE
- The Hours A BBC Radio 4 Full-cast Dramatisation (Abridged) (2018) ISBN 0-374-17289-7 ASIN B07DYDRXPY
- Pride and Prejudice (Unabridged) (2015) ISBN 979-8565411881 ASIN B016LN4BYA
- Sense and Sensibility (Unabridged) (2018) ISBN 978-1980245094 ASIN B07FDJPVWX
- A Slow Fire Burning (2021) ISBN 978-0735211230 ASIN B08PG3YNST
- The Eye of the World (Unabridged) (2021) ISBN 0-312-85009-3 ASIN B09JT5JR49
- The Great Hunt (Unabridged) (2022) ISBN 0-312-85140-5 ASIN B0B7KGZLKB
- Origins of The Wheel of Time: The Legends and Mythologies that Inspired Robert Jordan (2021) ISBN 978-1250860521 ASIN B0B725LXC6
- The Dragon Reborn (Unabridged) (2023) ISBN 0-312-85248-7 ASIN B0B7KLSK3K
- The Shadow Rising (Unabridged) (2024) ISBN 0-312-854-31-5 ASIN B0D94V1ZYD

== See also ==
- List of Academy Award winners and nominees from Great Britain
- List of actors with Academy Award nominations
- List of British actors
- List of Golden Globe winners
- List of Primetime Emmy Award winners
