= Amy Dunne =

Fictional character from Gone Girl

- Gone Girl character
- Rosamund Pike as Amy Dunne in Gone Girl
- First appearance: Gone Girl; (2012)
- Created by: Gillian Flynn
- Portrayed by: Rosamund Pike

In-universe information
- Full name: Amy Elliot Dunne
- Alias: Nancy
- Gender: Female
- Occupation: Writer
- Spouse: Nick Dunne
- Nationality: American

Amy Dunne (née Wexford Elliott) is a fictional character created by Gillian Flynn in her 2012 novel Gone Girl. She is portrayed by English actress Rosamund Pike in the 2014 film adaptation of the same name. Described as "cold", "savvy" and "snobbish", Amy is a writer and diarist involved in a struggling marriage with her husband Nick Dunne. After learning that Nick has cheated on her with one of his students, Amy stages her own elaborate disappearance to have Nick arrested and executed for her murder.

Pike was cast as Amy after director David Fincher had seen her in multiple films but couldn't get a sense of who she was, a quality he felt was important to the character. While the character has received mixed reactions, Pike's performance received critical acclaim, which earned her multiple awards, including an Academy Award nomination for Best Actress in 2015.

== Appearances ==
Amy Dunne appears in the 2012 novel Gone Girl and its 2014 film adaption. After years of a frustrating marriage to her husband Nick, Amy discovers that he is cheating on her with Andie, a student of his. As revenge, Amy stages her disappearance and concocts an elaborate plan; faking a pregnancy and draining her own blood to smear on the floor of their house before haphazardly cleaning it, suggesting Nick violently murdered her.

Her original plan was to drown herself after Nick's arrest and have her body found to ensure his death sentence. She is robbed while on the run and turns to her wealthy ex-boyfriend Desi Collings, against whom Amy had earlier filed a restraining order. He lets her stay with him, but Amy has regrets about framing Nick after seeing him plead for her return in a televised interview. After watching Nick's interview, she rekindles her attraction to him and spends weeks crafting an escape story from Desi.

Using lakehouse surveillance cameras and self-inflicted injuries, she makes it appear that Desi kidnapped and raped her. She then seduces Desi, slits his throat during sex, and returns home covered in his blood, thus clearing Nick of suspicion. The FBI believes Amy's story, but she tells Nick everything that happened. A televised interview takes place in their home seven weeks later. Anticipating Nick's intention to leave her and publicly expose her story, Amy reveals her pregnancy minutes before the interview, having inseminated herself with Nick's sperm from a fertility clinic. Nick reacts violently at first, but feels responsible for the child and ultimately decides to stay with Amy.

== Development ==
=== Creation and characterization ===
When asked about Amy's noble qualities, author Gillian Flynn cited traits such as high ambition, intelligence, and tenacity, which she takes to an extreme. When writing Amy's character, she listened to music beforehand to get into character, namely the song "Down in the Willow Garden" as she envisioned Amy listening to it when writing her diary entries. The character has been described as "savvy" and as a "mastermind" yet "cold" and "snobbish".

When writing Gone Girl, Flynn had missing white woman syndrome in mind, with the phenomenon driving the story's plot and being a key reason Amy's plan works out. Flynn also said she envisioned her as someone who knew the tropes about being a woman, unafraid to use them to get her way. Despite not necessarily intending to make a statement, Flynn wanted to "play with how far can you push a female antihero" when writing Amy's character, saying "I wanted to create a female villain that you cannot write off and that feels in some way that she walks this world" when asked about it. Flynn cites Amy's "cool girl" monologue as being inspired by the 1998 film There's Something About Mary, as Mary Jensen (Cameron Diaz) fit the archetype in the film. The monologue itself was penned by Flynn during a writing exercise and was not initially intended to be included in the book, but Flynn felt it suited Amy and ultimately included the monologue. Flynn also believed that the moment humanized Amy and expressed her point of view.

=== Film adaptation ===
For the 2014 film adaptation, Amy's characterization was slightly altered, with the character being written as slightly more despicable and ruthless. When casting Amy for the film adaptation, director David Fincher became interested in Rosamund Pike after her name was brought up as he had seen her in multiple films and never managed to gain an impression of her or her acting style. This opacity, combined with her status as an only child like Amy, gained her the role. Pike's opinion on Amy reportedly goes beyond whether or not she likes her, more so that she understands her. To portray the character, Pike wore a wig while filming. Fincher found himself rooting for Amy in parts of the film, as he enjoyed the character's cunning plan unfold.

Flynn helped Fincher design the Amazing Amy book series, comparing it to the Ramona novel series.

== Reception ==
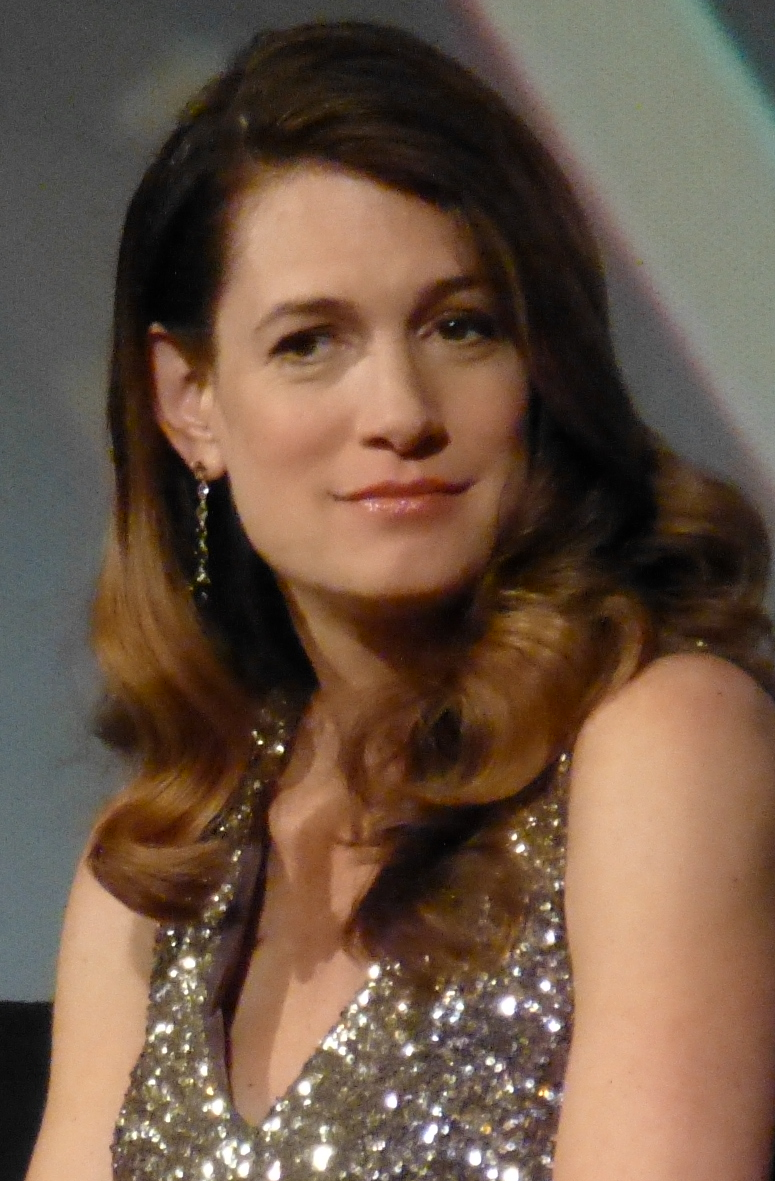
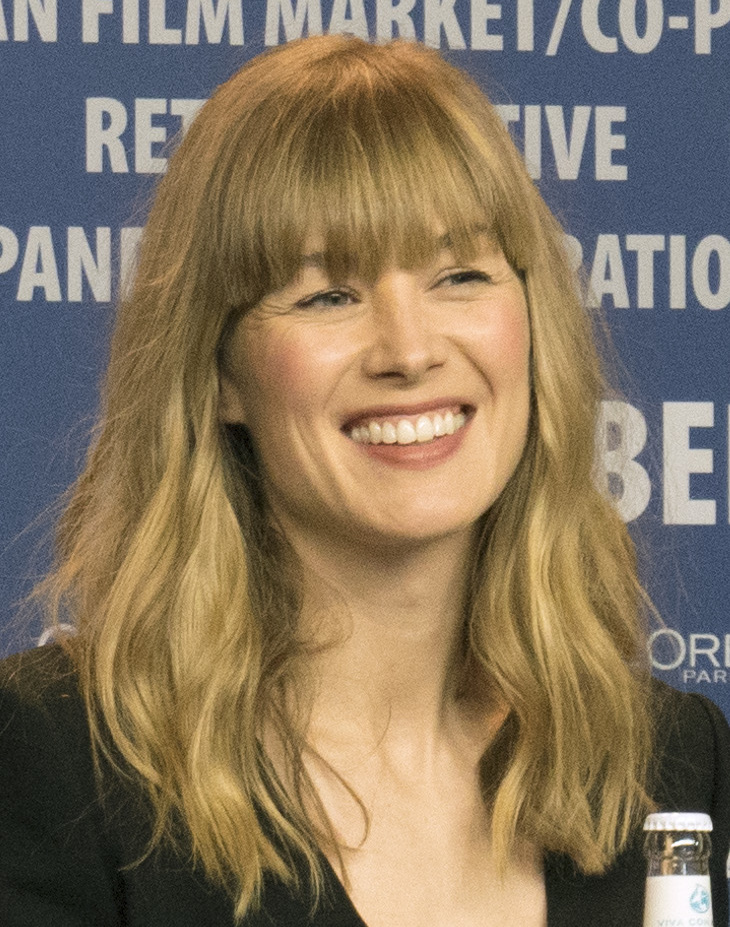
Amy's creator Gillian Flynn (left, pictured in 2014) and portrayer Rosamund Pike (right, pictured in 2018) both received critical acclaim for their work on the character.

Joan Smith of Sunday Times praised Flynn's work on writing Amy, calling it "subtly drawn", and that it helped the story feel unpredictable. Katey Rich of Vanity Fair named Amy the most disturbing female villain of all time. Amanda Dobbins of Vulture wrote that Flynn created a "sociopathic" and "morally indefensible" character in Amy, which helped the novel to become a compelling read. Lexy Perez of Hollywood Reporter called Amy's arc the "most memorable aspect" of the book, writing that Amy is "a fresh, if unnerving" take on the anti-heroine archetype. Pinkbookworm of The Guardian called Amy's characterization "phenomenal" in a review of the novel. Emine Saner of The Guardian praised Amy's character, writing "[Amy] Dunne isn’t likeable but she is compelling". The character is generally credited in starting "The Gone Girl Effect" where every novel with an unreliable female narrator began drawing comparisons to Gone Girl and Amy Dunne. Jessica Coen of Jezebel believed Amy was a more compelling character in the novel, calling her character "vivid" and believing that film's depiction "pales in comparison" and was fairly one-note. Emily St. James of Vox was critical of Amy's character, writing that she comes across more as a "collection of plot twists" than a legitimate character.

Pike's performance as Amy in the 2014 film was widely praised. Pike received an Academy Award for Best Actress nomination at the 87th Academy Awards in 2015 for her performance. Geoffrey Macnab of The Independent wrote that Pike captured her character's "Martha Stewart-like perfectionism" with relentless drive. Aimee Ferrier of Far Out praised Pike's performance, calling it "incredible" and complimenting the actress's ability to portray a "cold, plotting psychopath" with depth. Ben Sherlock of Screen Rant listed Amy as one of the eight best David Fincher villains, naming Amy a "quintessential femme fatale" and praising Pike's performance. MovieWeb ranked Amy Dunne as Pike's best performance, calling it "beyond brilliant" and convincingly evil. Pike's performance was listed as one of the 30 best of the 2010s by In Their Own League, with James Cain writing that Pike "sells it 100%". Amanda Greever of The Daily Times was positive towards Pike's performance, writing that she seemed to "relish each delicious twist and turn the character takes", adding that it was "very entertaining" to watch.

== Cultural impact ==
Amy is a polarizing figure in feminist media studies.

When the novel was first published, an "onslaught" of discussion about how feminist it is was unleashed. Lexy Perez of Hollywood Reporter wrote that Flynn sparked important conversation about female characters in literature through Amy, and credited Amy with a rise of anti-heroine characters in media. Some people believe that Amy's portrayal perpetuates misogynistic stereotypes, which Flynn, who identifies as a feminist, vehemently denies. Emily St. James of Vox called the 2014 film "the most feminist mainstream movie" of its time, believing that Amy destroying Nick's life symbolized "taking back power for women" in the story. David Haglund of Slate praised Amy's "cool girl" speech, believing it effectively called out double standards faced by women. Eliana Dockterman of Time praised Amy's character, believing it to be a step in the right direction for complex female characters, writing that Fincher and Flynn "created a female role more complex than the women usually seen in blockbuster films" at the time.

Some argue that Amy perpetuates stereotypes of women making false rape allegations and call it a negative representation of a feminist and that she should not be considered a feminist character due to this. Lesley Coffin of The Mary Sue believed that Amy's portrayal was problematic, saying that it "supports a disturbing depiction of women as a threat to the male domain". She also heavily criticized Amy's false rape claim, writing that using rape as a plot device is "problematic" in the film. Alyssa Rosenberg of The Washington Post believed that the character could be considered both misandrist and misogynist as "she hates pretty much everyone" except Nick near the end of the story.

Gillian Flynn vehemently denies accusations of misogyny. In an interview with The Guardian, she said: "[calling the novel anti-feminist due to Amy's actions] puts a very, very small window on what feminism is," and defended Amy's character by saying "one thing that really frustrates me is this idea that women are innately good, innately nurturing" and that Amy's portrayal challenges this. Flynn also wrote on her website that she was unsatisfied with the lack of intimidating female villains in literature, and that Amy was a method of introducing a wicked female villain.
