= Culture Gabfest =

American pop culture podcast

Slate's Culture Gabfest
- Culture Gabfest Podcast Cover
- Genre: culture

Cast and voices
- Hosted by: Stephen Metcalf, Dana Stevens, and Julia Turner

Publication
- Original release: 2008
- Provider: Slate
- Updates: weekly

Related
- Website: slate.com/podcasts/culture-gabfest/

Slate's Culture Gabfest is a New York-based podcast from Slate hosted by Stephen Metcalf, Dana Stevens and Julia Turner. The show has been positively reviewed in The Guardian, The Daily Telegraph, The A.V. Club, and Kill Your Darlings, which described the show as the "distilled ... pleasures, the prowess and, indeed, the rigours of sophisticated cultural critique".

From 2012 until 2014, the show was also broadcast on the radio in an abridged version alongside the Slate Political Gabfest as part of WNYC's now discontinued Gabfest Radio.

The final episode of the show, "So Long and Thanks for all the Granola Edition" was released on July 1, 2026. The episode featured an outpouring of elegiac responses from fans and former guests (known on the show as "Friends of the Program" or "FOPs"). Turner, Metcalf and Stevens announced that they would be releasing an irregularly published newsletter, the Culture Gabletter, as a way of keeping in touch with listeners about their respective futures and possible further joint projects.
