= Virginia Sole-Smith =

American writer

- Occupation: Writer
- Writing career
- Subjects: Diet culture, fat acceptance movement, feminism
- Website: virginiasolesmith.com

Virginia Sole-Smith is an American writer whose work focuses on diet culture, fat acceptance, and feminism. She has written two books: The Eating Instinct (2018) and Fat Talk: Parenting in the Age of Diet Culture (2023). She has a Substack newsletter called Burnt Toast.
