= Stephen Metcalf (writer) =

American journalist

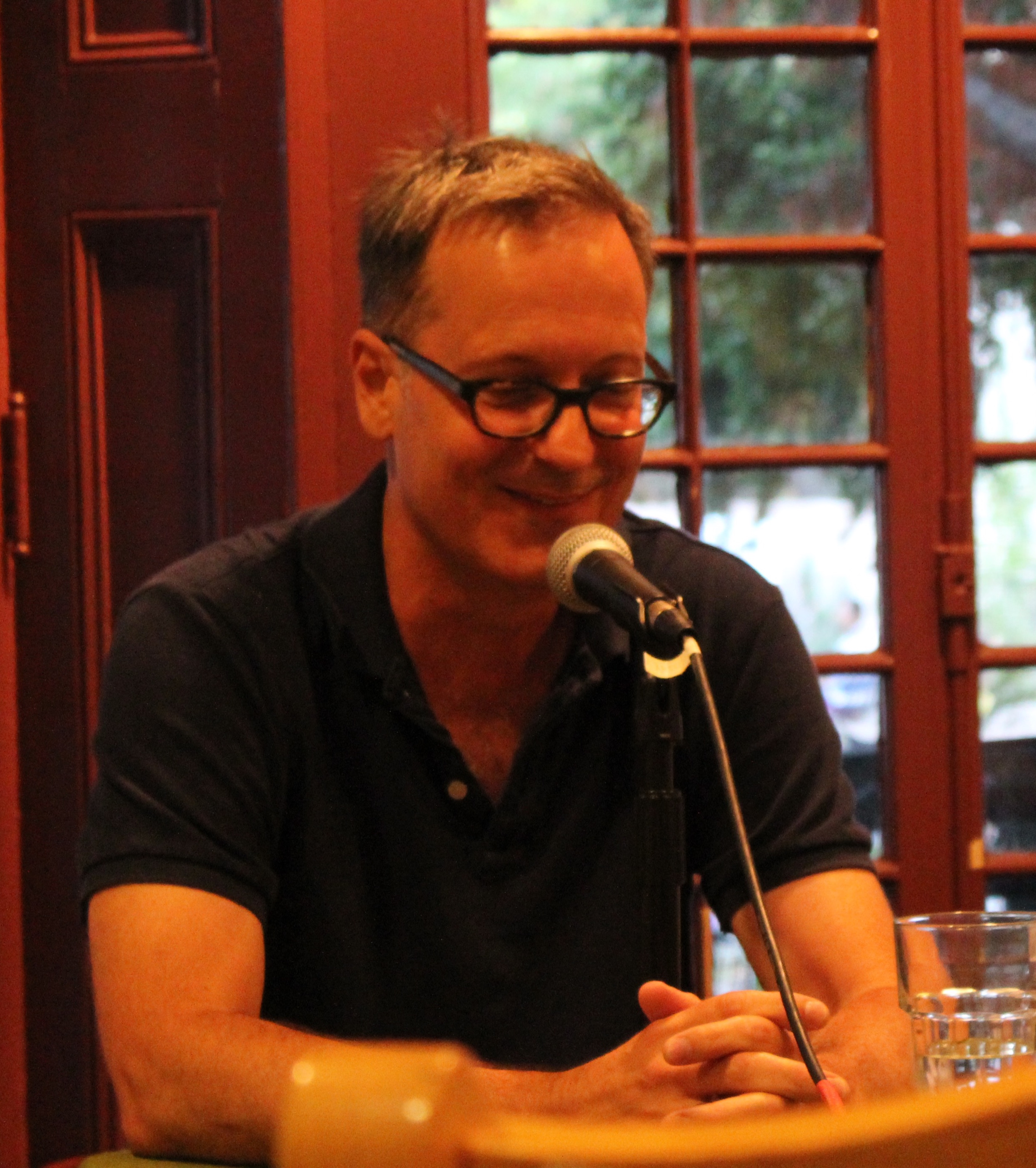
- Born: January 25, 1964 (age 62); New York City
- Education: Wesleyan University; University of Virginia; Yale University
- Occupations: Critic-at-large and columnist at Slate magazine
- Notable credit(s): Slate magazine, Culture Gabfest
- Spouse: Koethi Zan

Stephen Metcalf is a critic-at-large and columnist at Slate magazine. He is also the host of the magazine's weekly cultural podcast the Culture Gabfest.

== Biography ==
Metcalf attended Phillips Exeter Academy but, "three weeks shy of graduation, was asked by the school administration, in no uncertain terms, to leave." He then matriculated at Wesleyan University, later earning a master's degree from the University of Virginia. After spending some time working on a Ph.D. in the English graduate program at Yale University, he moved to New York City where he worked as a speechwriter for Hillary Clinton during her senate campaign and as a freelance writer. Subsequently, he joined Slate as a staff writer. He is Slate's "critic-at-large", writes the magazine's Dilettante column and serves as host of the magazine's culture podcast.

Metcalf's work has appeared in The New York Times, the New York Observer, New York (magazine), the Atlantic (magazine), and The New Yorker (magazine). He is currently working on a book about the 1980s, according to Slate (magazine).

He currently resides in Upstate New York with his wife, novelist Koethi Zan, and their two daughters, Stella and Kate.
