= Celebrity Memoir Book Club =

Podcast

- Genre: Comedy • Books
- Country of origin: United States
- Language: English

Cast and voices
- Hosted by: Claire Parker and Ashley Hamilton

Production
- Length: 60–120 minutes

Publication
- No. of episodes: 252
- Original release: 29 September 2020 – 12 August 2025
- Provider: Vox Media Podcast Network

Related
- Related shows: Hold On One Second We're Talking About Britney Spears; We're in a Fight with Claire and Ashley
- Website: https://www.celebritymemoirbookclub.biz/

Celebrity Memoir Book Club is a podcast hosted by comedians Claire Parker and Ashley Hamilton, in which the hosts review celebrity memoirs "so you don't have to". It is part of the Vox Media network. On August 12 2025, Parker and Hamilton released the final episode of Celebrity Memoir Book Club and announced their new podcast, Good Noticings, which launched on September 10, 2025.

== Background ==
Parker and Hamilton met in 2018 in the New York stand-up scene and had previously hosted two podcasts together – Hold On One Second We're Talking About Britney Spears and We’re in a Fight with Claire and Ashley – before starting Celebrity Memoir Book Club in 2020. The pair ended the former after news broke of Britney Spears' conservatorship, citing feeling "uncomfortable" speculating on Spears' personal life. Instead, they pivoted to podcasting about celebrity memoirs, as "a way to discuss people without bullying somebody". Spears' memoir, The Woman in Me, was later reviewed on an episode of Celebrity Memoir Book Club.

In June 2024, Vox Media added Celebrity Memoir Book Club to its podcast network, taking on marketing, sales, and distribution duties for the show.

== Books featured ==
Books covered on the podcast include:

- Spare – Prince Harry
- I'm Glad My Mom Died – Jeanette McCurdy
- The Woman in Me – Britney Spears
- Crying in H Mart – Michelle Zauner
- Born a Crime – Trevor Noah
- Greenlights – Matthew McConaughey
- Friends, Lovers, and the Big Terrible Thing – Matthew Perry

== Live shows ==
Parker and Hamilton have toured the podcast as a live show in the United States, Canada, Australia, Ireland, and the United Kingdom.

== Reception ==
Celebrity Memoir Book Club was named by Vogue and Esquire as one of the best podcasts of 2022. The podcast has also been recommended by The Guardian, The Boston Globe, Russh, and Town & Country.

The podcast was an honoree at the 2025 Webby Awards in the Arts & Culture Podcasts category.
