= Julia Turner (journalist) =

American journalist and critic (born c. 1979)

Julia Turner (born c. 1979) is an American journalist and critic. She was Deputy Managing Editor of the Los Angeles Times from 2018 to 2024 and a co-host of the Slate Culture Gabfest podcast. She was previously the editor-in-chief of online magazine Slate from 2014 to 2018.

Turner grew up in Boston, the daughter of two Boston Globe journalists. She attended Brown University. She joined online magazine Slate as an editorial assistant in 2003. She was deputy editor of Slate from 2008 to 2014, when she succeeded David Plotz as editor-in-chief. Turner stepped down as editor-in-chief in October 2018, to join the Los Angeles Times as a Deputy Managing Editor overseeing arts and entertainment. She was previously one of a panel of three hosts on Slate and WNYC's Gabfest Radio podcast, and is one of a panel of three hosts of Slate's Culture Gabfest podcast.

She lives with her husband in Los Angeles.
