= Dana Stevens (critic) =

American film critic (born 1966)

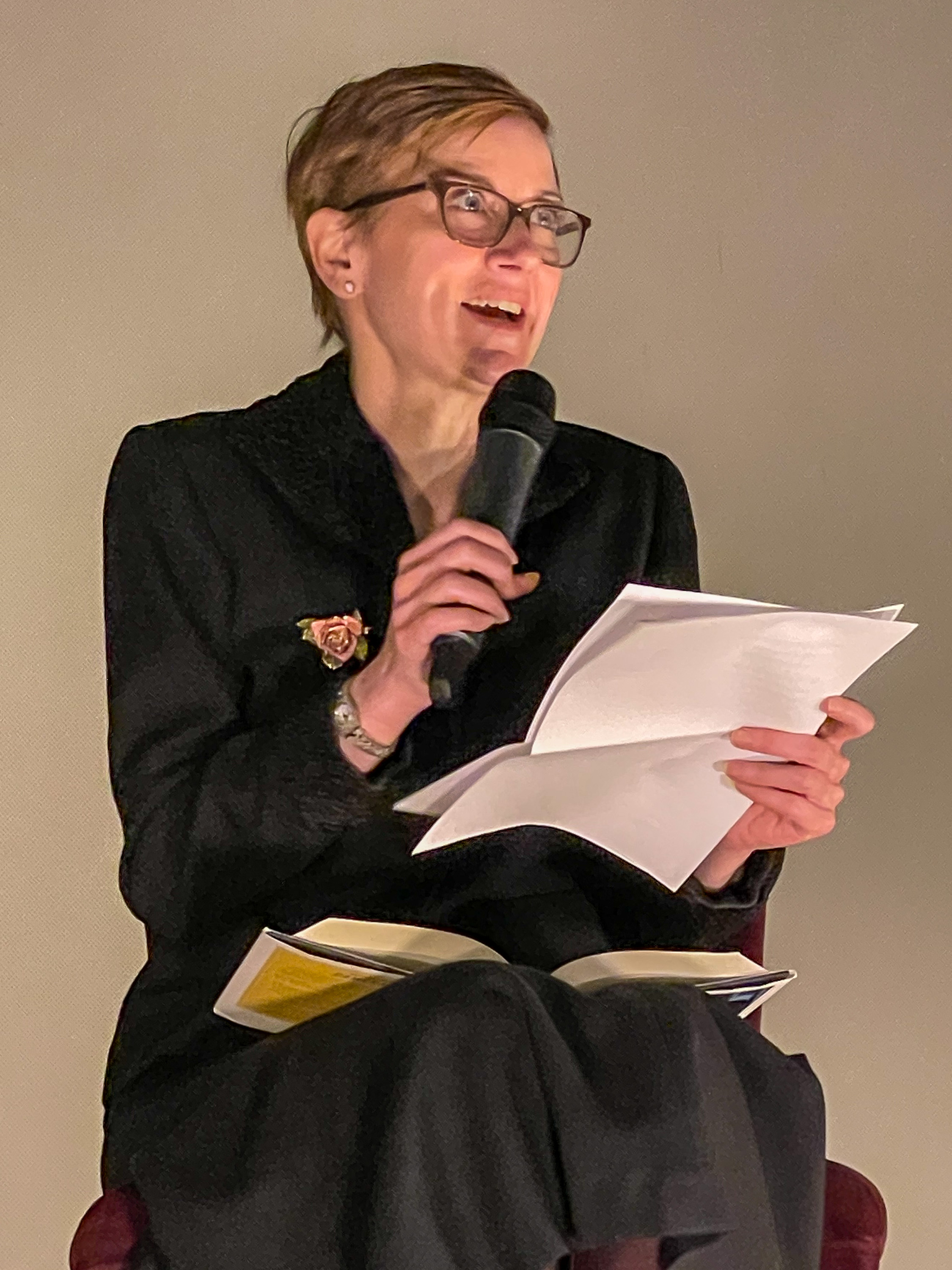
- Stevens in 2022
- Born: June 30, 1966 (age 60)
- Other name: Liz Penn
- Education: Vassar College (AB); University of California, Berkeley (PhD)
- Occupation: Film critic
- Notable credit(s): Slate magazine, Culture Gabfest

Dana Shawn Stevens (born June 30, 1966) is an American film critic who writes for Slate. She is also a cohost of the magazine's weekly cultural podcast, the Culture Gabfest. She is the author of a 2022 book about Buster Keaton and the 20th century titled Camera Man: Buster Keaton, the Dawn of Cinema, and the Invention of the Twentieth Century.

== Life and career ==
Stevens grew up in Scarsdale, New York; and San Antonio, Texas. She graduated from Vassar College and attained a doctorate in comparative literature from UC Berkeley in 2001 with a dissertation on Fernando Pessoa: A Local Habitation and a Name: Heteronymy and Nationalism in the works of Fernando Pessoa.

She joined Slate in mid-2003, writing the magazine's Surfergirl column on television and pop-culture. Before joining Slate she wrote under the pseudonym "Liz Penn" on her own (now-defunct) website/blog called the High Sign. She has written for The New York Times, The Washington Post Book World, Bookforum, and The Atlantic and has appeared on several occasions on Charlie Rose and The Brian Lehrer Show. She is a regular on Slate's Culture Gabfest.

Stevens has described herself as "an atheist raised in culturally Christian milieu". She lives in Brooklyn, New York.
